The Lepidoptera of Bulgaria consist of both the butterflies and moths recorded from Bulgaria.

Butterflies

Hesperiidae
Carcharodus alceae (Esper, 1780)
Carcharodus floccifera (Zeller, 1847)
Carcharodus lavatherae (Esper, 1783)
Carcharodus orientalis Reverdin, 1913
Carterocephalus palaemon (Pallas, 1771)
Erynnis marloyi (Boisduval, 1834)
Erynnis tages (Linnaeus, 1758)
Gegenes nostrodamus (Fabricius, 1793)
Hesperia comma (Linnaeus, 1758)
Heteropterus morpheus (Pallas, 1771)
Muschampia cribrellum (Eversmann, 1841)
Muschampia tessellum (Hübner, 1803)
Ochlodes sylvanus (Esper, 1777)
Pyrgus alveus (Hübner, 1803)
Pyrgus armoricanus (Oberthur, 1910)
Pyrgus cacaliae (Rambur, 1839)
Pyrgus carthami (Hübner, 1813)
Pyrgus cinarae (Rambur, 1839)
Pyrgus malvae (Linnaeus, 1758)
Pyrgus serratulae (Rambur, 1839)
Pyrgus sidae (Esper, 1784)
Spialia orbifer (Hübner, 1823)
Spialia phlomidis (Herrich-Schäffer, 1845)
Thymelicus acteon (Rottemburg, 1775)
Thymelicus lineola (Ochsenheimer, 1808)
Thymelicus sylvestris (Poda, 1761)

Lycaenidae
Agriades dardanus (Freyer, 1845)
Aricia agestis (Denis & Schiffermüller, 1775)
Aricia anteros (Freyer, 1838)
Aricia artaxerxes (Fabricius, 1793)
Callophrys rubi (Linnaeus, 1758)
Celastrina argiolus (Linnaeus, 1758)
Cupido minimus (Fuessly, 1775)
Cupido osiris (Meigen, 1829)
Cupido alcetas (Hoffmannsegg, 1804)
Cupido argiades (Pallas, 1771)
Cupido decolorata (Staudinger, 1886)
Cyaniris semiargus (Rottemburg, 1775)
Eumedonia eumedon (Esper, 1780)
Favonius quercus (Linnaeus, 1758)
Glaucopsyche alexis (Poda, 1761)
Iolana iolas (Ochsenheimer, 1816)
Kretania sephirus (Frivaldszky, 1835)
Lampides boeticus (Linnaeus, 1767)
Leptotes pirithous (Linnaeus, 1767)
Lycaena alciphron (Rottemburg, 1775)
Lycaena candens (Herrich-Schäffer, 1844)
Lycaena dispar (Haworth, 1802)
Lycaena helle (Denis & Schiffermüller, 1775)
Lycaena ottomanus (Lefebvre, 1830)
Lycaena phlaeas (Linnaeus, 1761)
Lycaena thersamon (Esper, 1784)
Lycaena tityrus (Poda, 1761)
Lycaena virgaureae (Linnaeus, 1758)
Lysandra bellargus (Rottemburg, 1775)
Lysandra coridon (Poda, 1761)
Phengaris alcon (Denis & Schiffermüller, 1775)
Phengaris arion (Linnaeus, 1758)
Phengaris nausithous (Bergstrasser, 1779)
Plebejus argus (Linnaeus, 1758)
Plebejus argyrognomon (Bergstrasser, 1779)
Plebejus idas (Linnaeus, 1761)
Polyommatus admetus (Esper, 1783)
Polyommatus aroaniensis (Brown, 1976)
Polyommatus nephohiptamenos (Brown & Coutsis, 1978)
Polyommatus orphicus Kolev, 2005
Polyommatus ripartii (Freyer, 1830)
Polyommatus daphnis (Denis & Schiffermüller, 1775)
Polyommatus amandus (Schneider, 1792)
Polyommatus dorylas (Denis & Schiffermüller, 1775)
Polyommatus eros (Ochsenheimer, 1808)
Polyommatus escheri (Hübner, 1823)
Polyommatus icarus (Rottemburg, 1775)
Polyommatus thersites (Cantener, 1835)
Pseudophilotes vicrama (Moore, 1865)
Satyrium acaciae (Fabricius, 1787)
Satyrium ilicis (Esper, 1779)
Satyrium pruni (Linnaeus, 1758)
Satyrium spini (Denis & Schiffermüller, 1775)
Satyrium w-album (Knoch, 1782)
Scolitantides orion (Pallas, 1771)
Tarucus balkanica (Freyer, 1844)
Thecla betulae (Linnaeus, 1758)

Nymphalidae
Aglais io (Linnaeus, 1758)
Aglais urticae (Linnaeus, 1758)
Apatura ilia (Denis & Schiffermüller, 1775)
Apatura iris (Linnaeus, 1758)
Apatura metis Freyer, 1829
Aphantopus hyperantus (Linnaeus, 1758)
Araschnia levana (Linnaeus, 1758)
Arethusana arethusa (Denis & Schiffermüller, 1775)
Argynnis paphia (Linnaeus, 1758)
Argynnis pandora (Denis & Schiffermüller, 1775)
Boloria graeca (Staudinger, 1870)
Boloria pales (Denis & Schiffermüller, 1775)
Boloria dia (Linnaeus, 1767)
Boloria euphrosyne (Linnaeus, 1758)
Boloria selene (Denis & Schiffermüller, 1775)
Boloria eunomia (Esper, 1799)
Brenthis daphne (Bergstrasser, 1780)
Brenthis hecate (Denis & Schiffermüller, 1775)
Brenthis ino (Rottemburg, 1775)
Brintesia circe (Fabricius, 1775)
Chazara briseis (Linnaeus, 1764)
Coenonympha arcania (Linnaeus, 1761)
Coenonympha glycerion (Borkhausen, 1788)
Coenonympha leander (Esper, 1784)
Coenonympha oedippus (Fabricius, 1787)
Coenonympha pamphilus (Linnaeus, 1758)
Coenonympha rhodopensis Elwes, 1900
Erebia aethiops (Esper, 1777)
Erebia alberganus (de Prunner, 1798)
Erebia cassioides (Reiner & Hochenwarth, 1792)
Erebia euryale (Esper, 1805)
Erebia gorge (Hübner, 1804)
Erebia ligea (Linnaeus, 1758)
Erebia medusa (Denis & Schiffermüller, 1775)
Erebia melas (Herbst, 1796)
Erebia oeme (Hübner, 1804)
Erebia orientalis Elwes, 1900
Erebia ottomana Herrich-Schäffer, 1847
Erebia pandrose (Borkhausen, 1788)
Erebia pronoe (Esper, 1780)
Erebia rhodopensis Nicholl, 1900
Euphydryas aurinia (Rottemburg, 1775)
Euphydryas cynthia (Denis & Schiffermüller, 1775)
Euphydryas maturna (Linnaeus, 1758)
Fabriciana adippe (Denis & Schiffermüller, 1775)
Fabriciana niobe (Linnaeus, 1758)
Hipparchia fagi (Scopoli, 1763)
Hipparchia syriaca (Staudinger, 1871)
Hipparchia fatua Freyer, 1844
Hipparchia statilinus (Hufnagel, 1766)
Hipparchia semele (Linnaeus, 1758)
Hipparchia senthes (Fruhstorfer, 1908)
Hipparchia volgensis (Mazochin-Porshnjakov, 1952)
Hyponephele lupinus (O. Costa, 1836)
Hyponephele lycaon (Rottemburg, 1775)
Issoria lathonia (Linnaeus, 1758)
Kirinia climene (Esper, 1783)
Kirinia roxelana (Cramer, 1777)
Lasiommata maera (Linnaeus, 1758)
Lasiommata megera (Linnaeus, 1767)
Lasiommata petropolitana (Fabricius, 1787)
Libythea celtis (Laicharting, 1782)
Limenitis camilla (Linnaeus, 1764)
Limenitis populi (Linnaeus, 1758)
Limenitis reducta Staudinger, 1901
Lopinga achine (Scopoli, 1763)
Maniola jurtina (Linnaeus, 1758)
Melanargia galathea (Linnaeus, 1758)
Melanargia larissa (Geyer, 1828)
Melitaea arduinna (Esper, 1783)
Melitaea athalia (Rottemburg, 1775)
Melitaea aurelia Nickerl, 1850
Melitaea britomartis Assmann, 1847
Melitaea cinxia (Linnaeus, 1758)
Melitaea diamina (Lang, 1789)
Melitaea didyma (Esper, 1778)
Melitaea phoebe (Denis & Schiffermüller, 1775)
Melitaea telona Fruhstorfer, 1908
Melitaea trivia (Denis & Schiffermüller, 1775)
Minois dryas (Scopoli, 1763)
Neptis rivularis (Scopoli, 1763)
Neptis sappho (Pallas, 1771)
Nymphalis antiopa (Linnaeus, 1758)
Nymphalis polychloros (Linnaeus, 1758)
Nymphalis xanthomelas (Esper, 1781)
Pararge aegeria (Linnaeus, 1758)
Polygonia c-album (Linnaeus, 1758)
Polygonia egea (Cramer, 1775)
Pseudochazara anthelea (Hübner, 1824)
Pseudochazara orestes De Prins & van der Poorten, 1981
Pyronia tithonus (Linnaeus, 1767)
Satyrus ferula (Fabricius, 1793)
Speyeria aglaja (Linnaeus, 1758)
Vanessa atalanta (Linnaeus, 1758)
Vanessa cardui (Linnaeus, 1758)

Papilionidae
Iphiclides podalirius (Linnaeus, 1758)
Papilio machaon Linnaeus, 1758
Parnassius apollo (Linnaeus, 1758)
Parnassius mnemosyne (Linnaeus, 1758)
Zerynthia cerisy (Godart, 1824)
Zerynthia polyxena (Denis & Schiffermüller, 1775)

Pieridae
Anthocharis cardamines (Linnaeus, 1758)
Anthocharis gruneri Herrich-Schäffer, 1851
Aporia crataegi (Linnaeus, 1758)
Colias alfacariensis Ribbe, 1905
Colias caucasica Staudinger, 1871
Colias croceus (Fourcroy, 1785)
Colias erate (Esper, 1805)
Colias hyale (Linnaeus, 1758)
Colias myrmidone (Esper, 1781)
Euchloe penia (Freyer, 1851)
Euchloe ausonia (Hübner, 1804)
Gonepteryx farinosa (Zeller, 1847)
Gonepteryx rhamni (Linnaeus, 1758)
Leptidea duponcheli (Staudinger, 1871)
Leptidea reali Reissinger, 1990
Leptidea sinapis (Linnaeus, 1758)
Pieris brassicae (Linnaeus, 1758)
Pieris ergane (Geyer, 1828)
Pieris krueperi Staudinger, 1860
Pieris mannii (Mayer, 1851)
Pieris napi (Linnaeus, 1758)
Pieris rapae (Linnaeus, 1758)
Pontia chloridice (Hübner, 1813)
Pontia edusa (Fabricius, 1777)

Riodinidae
Hamearis lucina (Linnaeus, 1758)

Moths

Adelidae
Adela australis (Heydenreich, 1851)
Adela reaumurella (Linnaeus, 1758)
Adela violella (Denis & Schiffermüller, 1775)
Cauchas leucocerella (Scopoli, 1763)
Nematopogon pilella (Denis & Schiffermüller, 1775)
Nematopogon robertella (Clerck, 1759)
Nematopogon schwarziellus Zeller, 1839
Nematopogon swammerdamella (Linnaeus, 1758)
Nemophora associatella (Zeller, 1839)
Nemophora barbatellus (Zeller, 1847)
Nemophora cupriacella (Hübner, 1819)
Nemophora degeerella (Linnaeus, 1758)
Nemophora dumerilella (Duponchel, 1839)
Nemophora fasciella (Fabricius, 1775)
Nemophora metallica (Poda, 1761)
Nemophora minimella (Denis & Schiffermüller, 1775)
Nemophora pfeifferella (Hübner, 1813)
Nemophora raddaella (Hübner, 1793)
Nemophora violellus (Herrich-Schäffer in Stainton, 1851)

Alucitidae
Alucita cymatodactyla Zeller, 1852
Alucita grammodactyla Zeller, 1841
Alucita huebneri Wallengren, 1859
Alucita major (Rebel, 1906)

Argyresthiidae
Argyresthia abdominalis Zeller, 1839
Argyresthia albistria (Haworth, 1828)
Argyresthia bonnetella (Linnaeus, 1758)
Argyresthia curvella (Linnaeus, 1761)
Argyresthia fundella (Fischer von Röslerstamm, 1835)
Argyresthia glaucinella Zeller, 1839
Argyresthia goedartella (Linnaeus, 1758)
Argyresthia pruniella (Clerck, 1759)
Argyresthia spinosella Stainton, 1849
Argyresthia glabratella (Zeller, 1847)
Argyresthia illuminatella Zeller, 1839

Autostichidae
Amselina cedestiella (Zeller, 1868)
Apatema apolausticum Gozmany, 1996
Apatema mediopallidum Walsingham, 1900
Aprominta atricanella (Rebel, 1906)
Aprominta designatella (Herrich-Schäffer, 1855)
Holcopogon bubulcellus (Staudinger, 1859)
Oegoconia caradjai Popescu-Gorj & Capuse, 1965
Oegoconia deauratella (Herrich-Schäffer, 1854)
Oegoconia novimundi (Busck, 1915)
Oegoconia uralskella Popescu-Gorj & Capuse, 1965

Bedelliidae
Bedellia somnulentella (Zeller, 1847)

Blastobasidae
Blastobasis phycidella (Zeller, 1839)

Brachodidae
Brachodes lucida (Lederer, 1853)
Brachodes pumila (Ochsenheimer, 1808)
Brachodes tristis (Staudinger, 1879)

Brahmaeidae
Lemonia balcanica (Herrich-Schäffer, 1847)
Lemonia dumi (Linnaeus, 1761)
Lemonia taraxaci (Denis & Schiffermüller, 1775)

Bucculatricidae
Bucculatrix maritima Stainton, 1851
Bucculatrix thoracella (Thunberg, 1794)

Carposinidae
Carposina scirrhosella Herrich-Schäffer, 1854

Chimabachidae
Dasystoma salicella (Hübner, 1796)
Diurnea lipsiella (Denis & Schiffermüller, 1775)

Choreutidae
Anthophila fabriciana (Linnaeus, 1767)
Prochoreutis myllerana (Fabricius, 1794)
Prochoreutis stellaris (Zeller, 1847)

Coleophoridae
Coleophora adspersella Benander, 1939
Coleophora aestuariella Bradley, 1984
Coleophora agrianella Rebel, 1934
Coleophora albella (Thunberg, 1788)
Coleophora albicans Zeller, 1849
Coleophora albitarsella Zeller, 1849
Coleophora alcyonipennella (Kollar, 1832)
Coleophora alticolella Zeller, 1849
Coleophora anatipenella (Hübner, 1796)
Coleophora argentula (Stephens, 1834)
Coleophora artemisicolella Bruand, 1855
Coleophora badiipennella (Duponchel, 1843)
Coleophora ballotella (Fischer v. Röslerstamm, 1839)
Coleophora ciconiella Herrich-Schäffer, 1855
Coleophora clypeiferella Hofmann, 1871
Coleophora coarctataephaga Toll, 1961
Coleophora congeriella Staudinger, 1859
Coleophora coronillae Zeller, 1849
Coleophora cracella (Vallot, 1835)
Coleophora deauratella Lienig & Zeller, 1846
Coleophora deviella Zeller, 1847
Coleophora dianthi Herrich-Schäffer, 1855
Coleophora ditella Zeller, 1849
Coleophora expressella Klemensiewicz, 1902
Coleophora follicularis (Vallot, 1802)
Coleophora glaseri Toll, 1961
Coleophora glaucicolella Wood, 1892
Coleophora graminicolella Heinemann, 1876
Coleophora gryphipennella (Hübner, 1796)
Coleophora hartigi Toll, 1944
Coleophora hungariae Gozmany, 1955
Coleophora inulae Wocke, 1877
Coleophora kroneella Fuchs, 1899
Coleophora lutipennella (Zeller, 1838)
Coleophora maritimella Newman, 1863
Coleophora medelichensis Krone, 1908
Coleophora millefolii Zeller, 1849
Coleophora niveicostella Zeller, 1839
Coleophora obtectella Zeller, 1849
Coleophora occatella Staudinger, 1880
Coleophora ochripennella Zeller, 1849
Coleophora ochroflava Toll, 1961
Coleophora onopordiella Zeller, 1849
Coleophora oriolella Zeller, 1849
Coleophora ornatipennella (Hübner, 1796)
Coleophora parvicuprella Baldizzone & Tabell, 2006
Coleophora pennella (Denis & Schiffermüller, 1775)
Coleophora peribenanderi Toll, 1943
Coleophora pratella Zeller, 1871
Coleophora pseudociconiella Toll, 1952
Coleophora pseudodianthi Baldizzone & Tabell, 2006
Coleophora remizella Baldizzone, 1983
Coleophora salinella Stainton, 1859
Coleophora serinipennella Christoph, 1872
Coleophora siccifolia Stainton, 1856
Coleophora silenella Herrich-Schäffer, 1855
Coleophora soffneriella Toll, 1961
Coleophora sternipennella (Zetterstedt, 1839)
Coleophora stramentella Zeller, 1849
Coleophora supinella Ortner, 1949
Coleophora tamesis Waters, 1929
Coleophora tanaceti Muhlig, 1865
Coleophora therinella Tengstrom, 1848
Coleophora trifolii (Curtis, 1832)
Coleophora tyrrhaenica Amsel, 1951
Coleophora variicornis Toll, 1952
Coleophora varnella Baldizzone & Tabell, 2006
Coleophora versurella Zeller, 1849
Coleophora vestianella (Linnaeus, 1758)
Coleophora vibicella (Hübner, 1813)
Coleophora vibicigerella Zeller, 1839
Coleophora virgatella Zeller, 1849
Coleophora vulnerariae Zeller, 1839
Coleophora vulpecula Zeller, 1849
Coleophora zelleriella Heinemann, 1854

Cosmopterigidae
Cosmopterix lienigiella Zeller, 1846
Cosmopterix orichalcea Stainton, 1861
Cosmopterix zieglerella (Hübner, 1810)
Eteobalea anonymella (Riedl, 1965)
Eteobalea intermediella (Riedl, 1966)
Eteobalea isabellella (O. G. Costa, 1836)
Eteobalea serratella (Treitschke, 1833)
Eteobalea sumptuosella (Lederer, 1855)
Limnaecia phragmitella Stainton, 1851
Pancalia leuwenhoekella (Linnaeus, 1761)
Pancalia nodosella (Bruand, 1851)
Pancalia schwarzella (Fabricius, 1798)
Pyroderces argyrogrammos (Zeller, 1847)
Pyroderces caesaris Gozmany, 1957
Sorhagenia lophyrella (Douglas, 1846)

Cossidae
Acossus terebra (Denis & Schiffermüller, 1775)
Cossus cossus (Linnaeus, 1758)
Dyspessa salicicola (Eversmann, 1848)
Dyspessa ulula (Borkhausen, 1790)
Parahypopta caestrum (Hübner, 1808)
Phragmataecia castaneae (Hübner, 1790)
Stygia mosulensis Daniel, 1965
Zeuzera pyrina (Linnaeus, 1761)

Crambidae
Acentria ephemerella (Denis & Schiffermüller, 1775)
Achyra nudalis (Hübner, 1796)
Agriphila brioniellus (Zerny, 1914)
Agriphila dalmatinellus (Hampson, 1900)
Agriphila deliella (Hübner, 1813)
Agriphila inquinatella (Denis & Schiffermüller, 1775)
Agriphila latistria (Haworth, 1811)
Agriphila poliellus (Treitschke, 1832)
Agriphila selasella (Hübner, 1813)
Agriphila straminella (Denis & Schiffermüller, 1775)
Agriphila tersellus (Lederer, 1855)
Agriphila tolli (Błeszyński, 1952)
Agriphila tristella (Denis & Schiffermüller, 1775)
Agrotera nemoralis (Scopoli, 1763)
Anania coronata (Hufnagel, 1767)
Anania crocealis (Hübner, 1796)
Anania funebris (Strom, 1768)
Anania fuscalis (Denis & Schiffermüller, 1775)
Anania hortulata (Linnaeus, 1758)
Anania lancealis (Denis & Schiffermüller, 1775)
Anania stachydalis (Germar, 1821)
Anania terrealis (Treitschke, 1829)
Anania verbascalis (Denis & Schiffermüller, 1775)
Anarpia incertalis (Duponchel, 1832)
Ancylolomia palpella (Denis & Schiffermüller, 1775)
Ancylolomia pectinatellus (Zeller, 1847)
Ancylolomia tentaculella (Hübner, 1796)
Aporodes floralis (Hübner, 1809)
Atralata albofascialis (Treitschke, 1829)
Calamotropha aureliellus (Fischer v. Röslerstamm, 1841)
Calamotropha paludella (Hübner, 1824)
Cataclysta lemnata (Linnaeus, 1758)
Catoptria acutangulellus (Herrich-Schäffer, 1847)
Catoptria biformellus (Drenowski, 1925)
Catoptria casperella Ganev, 1983
Catoptria confusellus (Staudinger, 1882)
Catoptria domaviellus (Rebel, 1904)
Catoptria falsella (Denis & Schiffermüller, 1775)
Catoptria gozmanyi Błeszyński, 1956
Catoptria laevigatellus (Lederer, 1870)
Catoptria languidellus (Zeller, 1863)
Catoptria luctiferella (Hübner, 1813)
Catoptria lythargyrella (Hübner, 1796)
Catoptria margaritella (Denis & Schiffermüller, 1775)
Catoptria myella (Hübner, 1796)
Catoptria mytilella (Hübner, 1805)
Catoptria olympica Ganev, 1983
Catoptria osthelderi (Lattin, 1950)
Catoptria permutatellus (Herrich-Schäffer, 1848)
Catoptria petrificella (Hübner, 1796)
Catoptria pinella (Linnaeus, 1758)
Catoptria pyramidellus (Treitschke, 1832)
Catoptria siliciellus (Rebel, 1893)
Catoptria verellus (Zincken, 1817)
Chilo luteellus (Motschulsky, 1866)
Chilo pulverosellus Ragonot, 1895
Cholius luteolaris (Scopoli, 1772)
Chrysocrambus craterella (Scopoli, 1763)
Chrysocrambus linetella (Fabricius, 1781)
Chrysoteuchia culmella (Linnaeus, 1758)
Crambus lathoniellus (Zincken, 1817)
Crambus pascuella (Linnaeus, 1758)
Crambus perlella (Scopoli, 1763)
Crambus pratella (Linnaeus, 1758)
Crambus silvella (Hübner, 1813)
Crambus uliginosellus Zeller, 1850
Cynaeda dentalis (Denis & Schiffermüller, 1775)
Diasemia reticularis (Linnaeus, 1761)
Diasemiopsis ramburialis (Duponchel, 1834)
Dolicharthria bruguieralis (Duponchel, 1833)
Dolicharthria punctalis (Denis & Schiffermüller, 1775)
Dolicharthria stigmosalis (Herrich-Schäffer, 1848)
Donacaula forficella (Thunberg, 1794)
Donacaula mucronella (Denis & Schiffermüller, 1775)
Donacaula niloticus (Zeller, 1867)
Ecpyrrhorrhoe diffusalis (Guenee, 1854)
Ecpyrrhorrhoe rubiginalis (Hübner, 1796)
Elophila nymphaeata (Linnaeus, 1758)
Epascestria pustulalis (Hübner, 1823)
Ephelis cruentalis (Geyer, 1832)
Euchromius bella (Hübner, 1796)
Euchromius ocellea (Haworth, 1811)
Euchromius ramburiellus (Duponchel, 1836)
Euchromius rayatellus (Amsel, 1949)
Euchromius superbellus (Zeller, 1849)
Euclasta splendidalis (Herrich-Schäffer, 1848)
Eudonia delunella (Stainton, 1849)
Eudonia lacustrata (Panzer, 1804)
Eudonia mercurella (Linnaeus, 1758)
Eudonia phaeoleuca (Zeller, 1846)
Eudonia truncicolella (Stainton, 1849)
Eurrhypis cacuminalis (Eversmann, 1843)
Eurrhypis guttulalis (Herrich-Schäffer, 1848)
Eurrhypis pollinalis (Denis & Schiffermüller, 1775)
Evergestis aenealis (Denis & Schiffermüller, 1775)
Evergestis alborivulalis (Eversmann, 1844)
Evergestis caesialis (Herrich-Schäffer, 1849)
Evergestis desertalis (Hübner, 1813)
Evergestis extimalis (Scopoli, 1763)
Evergestis forficalis (Linnaeus, 1758)
Evergestis frumentalis (Linnaeus, 1761)
Evergestis limbata (Linnaeus, 1767)
Evergestis pallidata (Hufnagel, 1767)
Evergestis politalis (Denis & Schiffermüller, 1775)
Evergestis segetalis (Herrich-Schäffer, 1851)
Evergestis sophialis (Fabricius, 1787)
Evergestis subfuscalis (Staudinger, 1871)
Friedlanderia cicatricella (Hübner, 1824)
Gesneria centuriella (Denis & Schiffermüller, 1775)
Heliothela wulfeniana (Scopoli, 1763)
Hyperlais dulcinalis (Treitschke, 1835)
Loxostege aeruginalis (Hübner, 1796)
Loxostege deliblatica Szent-Ivany & Uhrik-Meszaros, 1942
Loxostege manualis (Geyer, 1832)
Loxostege mucosalis (Herrich-Schäffer, 1848)
Loxostege sticticalis (Linnaeus, 1761)
Loxostege turbidalis (Treitschke, 1829)
Loxostege virescalis (Guenee, 1854)
Mecyna biternalis (Mann, 1862)
Mecyna flavalis (Denis & Schiffermüller, 1775)
Mecyna lutealis (Duponchel, 1833)
Mecyna subsequalis (Herrich-Schäffer, 1851)
Mecyna trinalis (Denis & Schiffermüller, 1775)
Mesocrambus candiellus (Herrich-Schäffer, 1848)
Metacrambus carectellus (Zeller, 1847)
Metasia carnealis (Treitschke, 1829)
Metasia ophialis (Treitschke, 1829)
Metasia suppandalis (Hübner, 1823)
Metaxmeste phrygialis (Hübner, 1796)
Metaxmeste schrankiana (Hochenwarth, 1785)
Nomophila noctuella (Denis & Schiffermüller, 1775)
Nymphula nitidulata (Hufnagel, 1767)
Orenaia alpestralis (Fabricius, 1787)
Ostrinia nubilalis (Hübner, 1796)
Ostrinia palustralis (Hübner, 1796)
Palpita vitrealis (Rossi, 1794)
Paracorsia repandalis (Denis & Schiffermüller, 1775)
Parapoynx nivalis (Denis & Schiffermüller, 1775)
Parapoynx stratiotata (Linnaeus, 1758)
Paratalanta hyalinalis (Hübner, 1796)
Paratalanta pandalis (Hübner, 1825)
Pediasia aridella (Thunberg, 1788)
Pediasia contaminella (Hübner, 1796)
Pediasia jucundellus (Herrich-Schäffer, 1847)
Pediasia luteella (Denis & Schiffermüller, 1775)
Pediasia matricella (Treitschke, 1832)
Platytes alpinella (Hübner, 1813)
Platytes cerussella (Denis & Schiffermüller, 1775)
Pleuroptya balteata (Fabricius, 1798)
Pleuroptya ruralis (Scopoli, 1763)
Psammotis pulveralis (Hübner, 1796)
Pseudobissetia terrestrellus (Christoph, 1885)
Pyrausta aerealis (Hübner, 1793)
Pyrausta amatalis Rebel, 1903
Pyrausta aurata (Scopoli, 1763)
Pyrausta castalis Treitschke, 1829
Pyrausta cingulata (Linnaeus, 1758)
Pyrausta coracinalis Leraut, 1982
Pyrausta despicata (Scopoli, 1763)
Pyrausta falcatalis Guenee, 1854
Pyrausta nigrata (Scopoli, 1763)
Pyrausta obfuscata (Scopoli, 1763)
Pyrausta ostrinalis (Hübner, 1796)
Pyrausta porphyralis (Denis & Schiffermüller, 1775)
Pyrausta purpuralis (Linnaeus, 1758)
Pyrausta sanguinalis (Linnaeus, 1767)
Pyrausta virginalis Duponchel, 1832
Schoenobius gigantella (Denis & Schiffermüller, 1775)
Scirpophaga praelata (Scopoli, 1763)
Sclerocona acutella (Eversmann, 1842)
Scoparia basistrigalis Knaggs, 1866
Scoparia ganevi Leraut, 1985
Scoparia ingratella (Zeller, 1846)
Scoparia manifestella (Herrich-Schäffer, 1848)
Scoparia pyralella (Denis & Schiffermüller, 1775)
Scoparia subfusca Haworth, 1811
Sitochroa palealis (Denis & Schiffermüller, 1775)
Sitochroa verticalis (Linnaeus, 1758)
Synclera traducalis (Zeller, 1852)
Talis quercella (Denis & Schiffermüller, 1775)
Tegostoma comparalis (Hübner, 1796)
Thisanotia chrysonuchella (Scopoli, 1763)
Titanio normalis (Hübner, 1796)
Udea austriacalis (Herrich-Schäffer, 1851)
Udea ferrugalis (Hübner, 1796)
Udea fimbriatralis (Duponchel, 1834)
Udea fulvalis (Hübner, 1809)
Udea languidalis (Eversmann, 1842)
Udea lutealis (Hübner, 1809)
Udea nebulalis (Hübner, 1796)
Udea olivalis (Denis & Schiffermüller, 1775)
Udea prunalis (Denis & Schiffermüller, 1775)
Udea rhododendronalis (Duponchel, 1834)
Udea uliginosalis (Stephens, 1834)
Uresiphita gilvata (Fabricius, 1794)
Xanthocrambus saxonellus (Zincken, 1821)

Douglasiidae
Tinagma anchusella (Benander, 1936)

Drepanidae
Asphalia ruficollis (Denis & Schiffermüller, 1775)
Cilix asiatica O. Bang-Haas, 1907
Cilix glaucata (Scopoli, 1763)
Cymatophorina diluta (Denis & Schiffermüller, 1775)
Drepana falcataria (Linnaeus, 1758)
Habrosyne pyritoides (Hufnagel, 1766)
Ochropacha duplaris (Linnaeus, 1761)
Polyploca ridens (Fabricius, 1787)
Tethea ocularis (Linnaeus, 1767)
Tethea or (Denis & Schiffermüller, 1775)
Thyatira batis (Linnaeus, 1758)
Watsonalla binaria (Hufnagel, 1767)
Watsonalla cultraria (Fabricius, 1775)

Elachistidae
Agonopterix alstromeriana (Clerck, 1759)
Agonopterix curvipunctosa (Haworth, 1811)
Agonopterix doronicella (Wocke, 1849)
Agonopterix furvella (Treitschke, 1832)
Agonopterix laterella (Denis & Schiffermüller, 1775)
Agonopterix pallorella (Zeller, 1839)
Agonopterix propinquella (Treitschke, 1835)
Agonopterix tschorbadjiewi (Rebel, 1916)
Anchinia daphnella (Denis & Schiffermüller, 1775)
Anchinia laureolella Herrich-Schäffer, 1854
Blastodacna atra (Haworth, 1828)
Blastodacna hellerella (Duponchel, 1838)
Chrysoclista splendida Karsholt, 1997
Depressaria absynthiella Herrich-Schäffer, 1865
Depressaria discipunctella Herrich-Schäffer, 1854
Depressaria douglasella Stainton, 1849
Depressaria marcella Rebel, 1901
Depressaria pentheri Rebel, 1904
Depressaria dictamnella (Treitschke, 1835)
Elachista bedellella (Sircom, 1848)
Elachista festucicolella Zeller, 1859
Elachista grotenfelti Kaila, 2012
Elachista laetella Rebel, 1930
Elachista maculata Parenti, 1978
Elachista metella Kaila, 2002
Elachista nuraghella Amsel, 1951
Elachista occulta Parenti, 1978
Elachista ohridella Parenti, 2001
Elachista parvula Parenti, 1978
Elachista pullicomella Zeller, 1839
Elachista rudectella Stainton, 1851
Elachista slivenica Kaila, 2007
Elachista squamosella (Duponchel, 1843)
Elachista vegliae Parenti, 1978
Elachista anserinella Zeller, 1839
Elachista atricomella Stainton, 1849
Elachista consortella Stainton, 1851
Elachista contaminatella Zeller, 1847
Elachista tetragonella (Herrich-Schäffer, 1855)
Ethmia aurifluella (Hübner, 1810)
Ethmia haemorrhoidella (Eversmann, 1844)
Ethmia lugubris (Staudinger, 1879)
Ethmia terminella T. B. Fletcher, 1938
Ethmia tripunctella (Staudinger, 1879)
Exaeretia preisseckeri (Rebel, 1937)
Heinemannia festivella (Denis & Schiffermüller, 1775)
Heinemannia laspeyrella (Hübner, 1796)
Hypercallia citrinalis (Scopoli, 1763)
Orophia denisella (Denis & Schiffermüller, 1775)
Orophia ferrugella (Denis & Schiffermüller, 1775)
Perittia farinella (Thunberg, 1794)
Stephensia brunnichella (Linnaeus, 1767)
Telechrysis tripuncta (Haworth, 1828)

Endromidae
Endromis versicolora (Linnaeus, 1758)

Epermeniidae
Epermenia aequidentellus (E. Hofmann, 1867)
Epermenia chaerophyllella (Goeze, 1783)
Epermenia illigerella (Hübner, 1813)
Epermenia insecurella (Stainton, 1854)
Epermenia strictellus (Wocke, 1867)
Epermenia ochreomaculellus (Milliere, 1854)
Epermenia pontificella (Hübner, 1796)
Ochromolopis ictella (Hübner, 1813)

Erebidae
Amata kruegeri (Ragusa, 1904)
Amata phegea (Linnaeus, 1758)
Apopestes spectrum (Esper, 1787)
Arctia caja (Linnaeus, 1758)
Arctia festiva (Hufnagel, 1766)
Arctia flavia (Fuessly, 1779)
Arctia villica (Linnaeus, 1758)
Arctornis l-nigrum (Muller, 1764)
Atolmis rubricollis (Linnaeus, 1758)
Autophila asiatica (Staudinger, 1888)
Autophila dilucida (Hübner, 1808)
Autophila limbata (Staudinger, 1871)
Autophila anaphanes Boursin, 1940
Autophila ligaminosa (Eversmann, 1851)
Callimorpha dominula (Linnaeus, 1758)
Calliteara pudibunda (Linnaeus, 1758)
Calymma communimacula (Denis & Schiffermüller, 1775)
Calyptra thalictri (Borkhausen, 1790)
Catephia alchymista (Denis & Schiffermüller, 1775)
Catocala coniuncta (Esper, 1787)
Catocala conversa (Esper, 1783)
Catocala dilecta (Hübner, 1808)
Catocala disjuncta (Geyer, 1828)
Catocala diversa (Geyer, 1828)
Catocala electa (Vieweg, 1790)
Catocala elocata (Esper, 1787)
Catocala eutychea Treitschke, 1835
Catocala fraxini (Linnaeus, 1758)
Catocala fulminea (Scopoli, 1763)
Catocala hymenaea (Denis & Schiffermüller, 1775)
Catocala lupina Herrich-Schäffer, 1851
Catocala nupta (Linnaeus, 1767)
Catocala nymphaea (Esper, 1787)
Catocala nymphagoga (Esper, 1787)
Catocala promissa (Denis & Schiffermüller, 1775)
Catocala puerpera (Giorna, 1791)
Catocala separata Freyer, 1848
Catocala sponsa (Linnaeus, 1767)
Chelis maculosa (Gerning, 1780)
Clytie syriaca (Bugnion, 1837)
Colobochyla salicalis (Denis & Schiffermüller, 1775)
Coscinia cribraria (Linnaeus, 1758)
Coscinia striata (Linnaeus, 1758)
Cybosia mesomella (Linnaeus, 1758)
Cymbalophora pudica (Esper, 1785)
Cymbalophora rivularis (Menetries, 1832)
Diacrisia sannio (Linnaeus, 1758)
Diaphora luctuosa (Hübner, 1831)
Diaphora mendica (Clerck, 1759)
Dicallomera fascelina (Linnaeus, 1758)
Drasteria cailino (Lefebvre, 1827)
Drasteria caucasica (Kolenati, 1846)
Dysauxes ancilla (Linnaeus, 1767)
Dysauxes famula (Freyer, 1836)
Dysgonia algira (Linnaeus, 1767)
Dysgonia torrida (Guenee, 1852)
Eilema caniola (Hübner, 1808)
Eilema complana (Linnaeus, 1758)
Eilema costalis (Zeller, 1847)
Eilema depressa (Esper, 1787)
Eilema griseola (Hübner, 1803)
Eilema lurideola (Zincken, 1817)
Eilema lutarella (Linnaeus, 1758)
Eilema palliatella (Scopoli, 1763)
Eilema pseudocomplana (Daniel, 1939)
Eilema pygmaeola (Doubleday, 1847)
Eilema sororcula (Hufnagel, 1766)
Eublemma amoena (Hübner, 1803)
Eublemma minutata (Fabricius, 1794)
Eublemma ostrina (Hübner, 1808)
Eublemma parva (Hübner, 1808)
Eublemma polygramma (Duponchel, 1842)
Eublemma pudorina (Staudinger, 1889)
Eublemma purpurina (Denis & Schiffermüller, 1775)
Eublemma rosea (Hübner, 1790)
Eublemma viridula (Guenee, 1841)
Euclidia mi (Clerck, 1759)
Euclidia glyphica (Linnaeus, 1758)
Euclidia triquetra (Denis & Schiffermüller, 1775)
Euplagia quadripunctaria (Poda, 1761)
Euproctis chrysorrhoea (Linnaeus, 1758)
Euproctis similis (Fuessly, 1775)
Exophyla rectangularis (Geyer, 1828)
Grammodes bifasciata (Petagna, 1787)
Grammodes stolida (Fabricius, 1775)
Herminia grisealis (Denis & Schiffermüller, 1775)
Herminia tarsicrinalis (Knoch, 1782)
Herminia tarsipennalis (Treitschke, 1835)
Herminia tenuialis (Rebel, 1899)
Hypena munitalis Mann, 1861
Hypena obesalis Treitschke, 1829
Hypena obsitalis (Hübner, 1813)
Hypena palpalis (Hübner, 1796)
Hypena proboscidalis (Linnaeus, 1758)
Hypena rostralis (Linnaeus, 1758)
Hypenodes anatolica Schwingenschuss, 1938
Hyphantria cunea (Drury, 1773)
Hyphoraia aulica (Linnaeus, 1758)
Idia calvaria (Denis & Schiffermüller, 1775)
Laelia coenosa (Hübner, 1808)
Laspeyria flexula (Denis & Schiffermüller, 1775)
Leucoma salicis (Linnaeus, 1758)
Lithosia quadra (Linnaeus, 1758)
Lygephila craccae (Denis & Schiffermüller, 1775)
Lygephila lusoria (Linnaeus, 1758)
Lygephila pastinum (Treitschke, 1826)
Lygephila procax (Hübner, 1813)
Lygephila viciae (Hübner, 1822)
Lymantria dispar (Linnaeus, 1758)
Lymantria monacha (Linnaeus, 1758)
Macrochilo cribrumalis (Hübner, 1793)
Metachrostis dardouini (Boisduval, 1840)
Metachrostis velox (Hübner, 1813)
Miltochrista miniata (Forster, 1771)
Minucia lunaris (Denis & Schiffermüller, 1775)
Nodaria nodosalis (Herrich-Schäffer, 1851)
Nudaria mundana (Linnaeus, 1761)
Ocneria ledereri (Milliere, 1869)
Ocneria rubea (Denis & Schiffermüller, 1775)
Ocnogyna parasita (Hübner, 1790)
Odice arcuinna (Hübner, 1790)
Odice suava (Hübner, 1813)
Ophiusa tirhaca (Cramer, 1773)
Orectis proboscidata (Herrich-Schäffer, 1851)
Orgyia antiquoides (Hübner, 1822)
Orgyia antiqua (Linnaeus, 1758)
Paracolax tristalis (Fabricius, 1794)
Parascotia fuliginaria (Linnaeus, 1761)
Parasemia plantaginis (Linnaeus, 1758)
Parocneria detrita (Esper, 1785)
Parocneria terebinthi (Freyer, 1838)
Pechipogo plumigeralis Hübner, 1825
Pechipogo strigilata (Linnaeus, 1758)
Pelosia muscerda (Hufnagel, 1766)
Pelosia obtusa (Herrich-Schäffer, 1852)
Penthophera morio (Linnaeus, 1767)
Phragmatobia fuliginosa (Linnaeus, 1758)
Phragmatobia luctifera (Denis & Schiffermüller, 1775)
Phragmatobia placida (Frivaldszky, 1835)
Phytometra viridaria (Clerck, 1759)
Polypogon tentacularia (Linnaeus, 1758)
Raparna conicephala (Staudinger, 1870)
Rhyparia purpurata (Linnaeus, 1758)
Rhyparioides metelkana (Lederer, 1861)
Rivula sericealis (Scopoli, 1763)
Schrankia costaestrigalis (Stephens, 1834)
Schrankia taenialis (Hübner, 1809)
Scoliopteryx libatrix (Linnaeus, 1758)
Setina irrorella (Linnaeus, 1758)
Setina roscida (Denis & Schiffermüller, 1775)
Simplicia rectalis (Eversmann, 1842)
Spilosoma lubricipeda (Linnaeus, 1758)
Spilosoma lutea (Hufnagel, 1766)
Spilosoma urticae (Esper, 1789)
Thumatha senex (Hübner, 1808)
Trisateles emortualis (Denis & Schiffermüller, 1775)
Tyria jacobaeae (Linnaeus, 1758)
Utetheisa pulchella (Linnaeus, 1758)
Watsonarctia deserta (Bartel, 1902)
Zanclognatha lunalis (Scopoli, 1763)
Zanclognatha zelleralis (Wocke, 1850)
Zebeeba falsalis (Herrich-Schäffer, 1839)
Zekelita antiqualis (Hübner, 1809)
Zethes insularis Rambur, 1833

Eriocottidae
Deuterotinea balcanica Zagulajev, 1972

Euteliidae
Eutelia adoratrix (Staudinger, 1892)
Eutelia adulatrix (Hübner, 1813)

Gelechiidae
Acompsia cinerella (Clerck, 1759)
Agonochaetia quartana Povolny, 1990
Altenia modesta (Danilevsky, 1955)
Altenia scriptella (Hübner, 1796)
Anacampsis obscurella (Denis & Schiffermüller, 1775)
Anacampsis populella (Clerck, 1759)
Anacampsis scintillella (Fischer von Röslerstamm, 1841)
Anarsia lineatella Zeller, 1839
Apodia bifractella (Duponchel, 1843)
Aproaerema anthyllidella (Hübner, 1813)
Aristotelia decoratella (Staudinger, 1879)
Aristotelia decurtella (Hübner, 1813)
Aristotelia subdecurtella (Stainton, 1859)
Aristotelia subericinella (Duponchel, 1843)
Aroga aristotelis (Milliere, 1876)
Aroga flavicomella (Zeller, 1839)
Aroga velocella (Duponchel, 1838)
Athrips rancidella (Herrich-Schäffer, 1854)
Atremaea lonchoptera Staudinger, 1871
Brachmia blandella (Fabricius, 1798)
Brachmia dimidiella (Denis & Schiffermüller, 1775)
Bryotropha affinis (Haworth, 1828)
Bryotropha arabica Amsel, 1952
Bryotropha azovica Bidzilia, 1997
Bryotropha desertella (Douglas, 1850)
Bryotropha domestica (Haworth, 1828)
Bryotropha dryadella (Zeller, 1850)
Bryotropha figulella (Staudinger, 1859)
Bryotropha hendrikseni Karsholt & Rutten, 2005
Bryotropha hulli Karsholt & Rutten, 2005
Bryotropha plebejella (Zeller, 1847)
Bryotropha senectella (Zeller, 1839)
Bryotropha tachyptilella (Rebel, 1916)
Bryotropha terrella (Denis & Schiffermüller, 1775)
Carpatolechia decorella (Haworth, 1812)
Carpatolechia fugacella (Zeller, 1839)
Carpatolechia proximella (Hübner, 1796)
Caryocolum fibigerium Huemer, 1988
Caryocolum fischerella (Treitschke, 1833)
Caryocolum junctella (Douglas, 1851)
Caryocolum leucomelanella (Zeller, 1839)
Caryocolum tischeriella (Zeller, 1839)
Chionodes distinctella (Zeller, 1839)
Chionodes electella (Zeller, 1839)
Chionodes fumatella (Douglas, 1850)
Chionodes hayreddini Kocak, 1986
Chionodes viduella (Fabricius, 1794)
Chrysoesthia drurella (Fabricius, 1775)
Dichomeris alacella (Zeller, 1839)
Dichomeris derasella (Denis & Schiffermüller, 1775)
Dichomeris juniperella (Linnaeus, 1761)
Dichomeris marginella (Fabricius, 1781)
Dichomeris ustalella (Fabricius, 1794)
Dirhinosia cervinella (Eversmann, 1844)
Ephysteris insulella (Heinemann, 1870)
Ephysteris promptella (Staudinger, 1859)
Eulamprotes atrella (Denis & Schiffermüller, 1775)
Eulamprotes unicolorella (Duponchel, 1843)
Eulamprotes wilkella (Linnaeus, 1758)
Exoteleia dodecella (Linnaeus, 1758)
Exoteleia succinctella (Zeller, 1872)
Filatima spurcella (Duponchel, 1843)
Gelechia rhombella (Denis & Schiffermüller, 1775)
Gelechia scotinella Herrich-Schäffer, 1854
Gelechia sororculella (Hübner, 1817)
Gnorimoschema soffneri Riedl, 1965
Helcystogramma lutatella (Herrich-Schäffer, 1854)
Helcystogramma triannulella (Herrich-Schäffer, 1854)
Hypatima rhomboidella (Linnaeus, 1758)
Isophrictis anthemidella (Wocke, 1871)
Isophrictis striatella (Denis & Schiffermüller, 1775)
Klimeschiopsis kiningerella (Duponchel, 1843)
Lutilabria lutilabrella (Mann, 1857)
Megacraspedus binotella (Duponchel, 1843)
Megacraspedus dolosellus (Zeller, 1839)
Mesophleps silacella (Hübner, 1796)
Metzneria aestivella (Zeller, 1839)
Metzneria aprilella (Herrich-Schäffer, 1854)
Metzneria artificella (Herrich-Schäffer, 1861)
Metzneria diffusella Englert, 1974
Metzneria intestinella (Mann, 1864)
Metzneria lappella (Linnaeus, 1758)
Metzneria neuropterella (Zeller, 1839)
Metzneria paucipunctella (Zeller, 1839)
Mirificarma eburnella (Denis & Schiffermüller, 1775)
Monochroa cytisella (Curtis, 1837)
Monochroa lutulentella (Zeller, 1839)
Monochroa rumicetella (O. Hofmann, 1868)
Monochroa sepicolella (Herrich-Schäffer, 1854)
Monochroa servella (Zeller, 1839)
Monochroa tenebrella (Hübner, 1817)
Neotelphusa cisti (Stainton, 1869)
Nothris verbascella (Denis & Schiffermüller, 1775)
Parastenolechia nigrinotella (Zeller, 1847)
Pectinophora gossypiella (Saunders, 1844)
Pexicopia malvella (Hübner, 1805)
Phthorimaea operculella (Zeller, 1873)
Platyedra subcinerea (Haworth, 1828)
Prolita sexpunctella (Fabricius, 1794)
Prolita solutella (Zeller, 1839)
Pseudotelphusa paripunctella (Thunberg, 1794)
Pseudotelphusa scalella (Scopoli, 1763)
Psoricoptera gibbosella (Zeller, 1839)
Recurvaria leucatella (Clerck, 1759)
Recurvaria nanella (Denis & Schiffermüller, 1775)
Scrobipalpa acuminatella (Sircom, 1850)
Scrobipalpa artemisiella (Treitschke, 1833)
Scrobipalpa atriplicella (Fischer von Röslerstamm, 1841)
Scrobipalpa jariorum Huemer & Karsholt, 2010
Scrobipalpa kasyi Povolny, 1968
Scrobipalpa obsoletella (Fischer von Röslerstamm, 1841)
Scrobipalpa ocellatella (Boyd, 1858)
Scrobipalpa proclivella (Fuchs, 1886)
Scrobipalpa salinella (Zeller, 1847)
Scrobipalpa soffneri Povolny, 1964
Scrobipalpa thymelaeae (Amsel, 1939)
Sitotroga cerealella (Olivier, 1789)
Sophronia acaudella Rebel, 1903
Sophronia consanguinella Herrich-Schäffer, 1854
Sophronia sicariellus (Zeller, 1839)
Stomopteryx detersella (Zeller, 1847)
Stomopteryx remissella (Zeller, 1847)
Syncopacma cinctella (Clerck, 1759)
Syncopacma coronillella (Treitschke, 1833)
Syncopacma patruella (Mann, 1857)
Syncopacma taeniolella (Zeller, 1839)
Teleiodes luculella (Hübner, 1813)
Teleiodes wagae (Nowicki, 1860)
Teleiopsis diffinis (Haworth, 1828)
Teleiopsis terebinthinella (Herrich-Schäffer, 1856)
Thiotricha majorella (Rebel, 1910)
Xystophora carchariella (Zeller, 1839)
Xystophora pulveratella (Herrich-Schäffer, 1854)

Geometridae
Abraxas grossulariata (Linnaeus, 1758)
Abraxas sylvata (Scopoli, 1763)
Acasis appensata (Eversmann, 1842)
Acasis viretata (Hübner, 1799)
Aethalura punctulata (Denis & Schiffermüller, 1775)
Agriopis aurantiaria (Hübner, 1799)
Agriopis bajaria (Denis & Schiffermüller, 1775)
Agriopis beschkovi Ganev, 1987
Agriopis leucophaearia (Denis & Schiffermüller, 1775)
Agriopis marginaria (Fabricius, 1776)
Alcis jubata (Thunberg, 1788)
Alcis repandata (Linnaeus, 1758)
Aleucis distinctata (Herrich-Schäffer, 1839)
Alsophila aceraria (Denis & Schiffermüller, 1775)
Alsophila aescularia (Denis & Schiffermüller, 1775)
Angerona prunaria (Linnaeus, 1758)
Anticlea derivata (Denis & Schiffermüller, 1775)
Anticollix sparsata (Treitschke, 1828)
Apeira syringaria (Linnaeus, 1758)
Aplasta ononaria (Fuessly, 1783)
Aplocera columbata (Metzner, 1845)
Aplocera efformata (Guenee, 1858)
Aplocera plagiata (Linnaeus, 1758)
Aplocera praeformata (Hübner, 1826)
Aplocera simpliciata (Treitschke, 1835)
Apocheima hispidaria (Denis & Schiffermüller, 1775)
Apochima flabellaria (Heeger, 1838)
Archiearis parthenias (Linnaeus, 1761)
Artiora evonymaria (Denis & Schiffermüller, 1775)
Ascotis selenaria (Denis & Schiffermüller, 1775)
Asovia maeoticaria (Alphéraky, 1876)
Aspitates gilvaria (Denis & Schiffermüller, 1775)
Aspitates ochrearia (Rossi, 1794)
Asthena albulata (Hufnagel, 1767)
Asthena anseraria (Herrich-Schäffer, 1855)
Baptria tibiale (Esper, 1791)
Biston betularia (Linnaeus, 1758)
Biston strataria (Hufnagel, 1767)
Boudinotiana notha (Hübner, 1803)
Boudinotiana puella (Esper, 1787)
Bupalus piniaria (Linnaeus, 1758)
Cabera exanthemata (Scopoli, 1763)
Cabera pusaria (Linnaeus, 1758)
Campaea margaritaria (Linnaeus, 1761)
Camptogramma bilineata (Linnaeus, 1758)
Camptogramma scripturata (Hübner, 1799)
Carsia lythoxylata (Hübner, 1799)
Cataclysme riguata (Hübner, 1813)
Catarhoe cuculata (Hufnagel, 1767)
Catarhoe permixtaria (Herrich-Schäffer, 1856)
Catarhoe putridaria (Herrich-Schäffer, 1852)
Catarhoe rubidata (Denis & Schiffermüller, 1775)
Cepphis advenaria (Hübner, 1790)
Chariaspilates formosaria (Eversmann, 1837)
Charissa certhiatus (Rebel & Zerny, 1931)
Charissa obscurata (Denis & Schiffermüller, 1775)
Charissa pullata (Denis & Schiffermüller, 1775)
Charissa mucidaria (Hübner, 1799)
Charissa variegata (Duponchel, 1830)
Charissa ambiguata (Duponchel, 1830)
Charissa onustaria (Herrich-Schäffer, 1852)
Charissa intermedia (Wehrli, 1917)
Charissa glaucinaria (Hübner, 1799)
Chesias rufata (Fabricius, 1775)
Chiasmia aestimaria (Hübner, 1809)
Chiasmia clathrata (Linnaeus, 1758)
Chlorissa cloraria (Hübner, 1813)
Chlorissa viridata (Linnaeus, 1758)
Chloroclysta miata (Linnaeus, 1758)
Chloroclysta siterata (Hufnagel, 1767)
Chloroclystis v-ata (Haworth, 1809)
Cidaria fulvata (Forster, 1771)
Cleora cinctaria (Denis & Schiffermüller, 1775)
Cleorodes lichenaria (Hufnagel, 1767)
Cleta filacearia (Herrich-Schäffer, 1847)
Coenotephria ablutaria (Boisduval, 1840)
Coenotephria tophaceata (Denis & Schiffermüller, 1775)
Colostygia aptata (Hübner, 1813)
Colostygia aqueata (Hübner, 1813)
Colostygia austriacaria (Herrich-Schäffer, 1852)
Colostygia olivata (Denis & Schiffermüller, 1775)
Colostygia pectinataria (Knoch, 1781)
Colostygia turbata (Hübner, 1799)
Colotois pennaria (Linnaeus, 1761)
Comibaena bajularia (Denis & Schiffermüller, 1775)
Cosmorhoe ocellata (Linnaeus, 1758)
Costaconvexa polygrammata (Borkhausen, 1794)
Crocallis elinguaria (Linnaeus, 1758)
Crocallis tusciaria (Borkhausen, 1793)
Cyclophora linearia (Hübner, 1799)
Cyclophora porata (Linnaeus, 1767)
Cyclophora punctaria (Linnaeus, 1758)
Cyclophora suppunctaria (Zeller, 1847)
Cyclophora albiocellaria (Hübner, 1789)
Cyclophora annularia (Fabricius, 1775)
Cyclophora pendularia (Clerck, 1759)
Cyclophora puppillaria (Hübner, 1799)
Cyclophora quercimontaria (Bastelberger, 1897)
Cyclophora ruficiliaria (Herrich-Schäffer, 1855)
Dasycorsa modesta (Staudinger, 1879)
Docirava dervenaria (von Mentzer, 1981)
Dyscia innocentaria (Christoph, 1885)
Dysstroma citrata (Linnaeus, 1761)
Dysstroma truncata (Hufnagel, 1767)
Earophila badiata (Denis & Schiffermüller, 1775)
Ecliptopera capitata (Herrich-Schäffer, 1839)
Ecliptopera silaceata (Denis & Schiffermüller, 1775)
Ectropis crepuscularia (Denis & Schiffermüller, 1775)
Eilicrinia cordiaria (Hübner, 1790)
Eilicrinia trinotata (Metzner, 1845)
Electrophaes corylata (Thunberg, 1792)
Elophos dilucidaria (Denis & Schiffermüller, 1775)
Ematurga atomaria (Linnaeus, 1758)
Ennomos erosaria (Denis & Schiffermüller, 1775)
Ennomos fuscantaria (Haworth, 1809)
Ennomos quercaria (Hübner, 1813)
Ennomos quercinaria (Hufnagel, 1767)
Entephria caesiata (Denis & Schiffermüller, 1775)
Entephria cyanata (Hübner, 1809)
Entephria flavicinctata (Hübner, 1813)
Entephria nobiliaria (Herrich-Schäffer, 1852)
Epione repandaria (Hufnagel, 1767)
Epione vespertaria (Linnaeus, 1767)
Epirrhoe alternata (Muller, 1764)
Epirrhoe galiata (Denis & Schiffermüller, 1775)
Epirrhoe hastulata (Hübner, 1790)
Epirrhoe molluginata (Hübner, 1813)
Epirrhoe rivata (Hübner, 1813)
Epirrhoe tristata (Linnaeus, 1758)
Epirrita autumnata (Borkhausen, 1794)
Epirrita christyi (Allen, 1906)
Epirrita dilutata (Denis & Schiffermüller, 1775)
Erannis declinans (Staudinger, 1879)
Erannis defoliaria (Clerck, 1759)
Euchoeca nebulata (Scopoli, 1763)
Eucrostes indigenata (de Villers, 1789)
Eulithis populata (Linnaeus, 1758)
Eulithis prunata (Linnaeus, 1758)
Eumannia oppositaria (Mann, 1864)
Eumera regina Staudinger, 1892
Euphyia biangulata (Haworth, 1809)
Euphyia frustata (Treitschke, 1828)
Euphyia unangulata (Haworth, 1809)
Eupithecia abbreviata Stephens, 1831
Eupithecia abietaria (Goeze, 1781)
Eupithecia absinthiata (Clerck, 1759)
Eupithecia alliaria Staudinger, 1870
Eupithecia assimilata Doubleday, 1856
Eupithecia biornata Christoph, 1867
Eupithecia breviculata (Donzel, 1837)
Eupithecia carpophagata Staudinger, 1871
Eupithecia centaureata (Denis & Schiffermüller, 1775)
Eupithecia cretaceata (Packard, 1874)
Eupithecia cuculliaria (Rebel, 1901)
Eupithecia denotata (Hübner, 1813)
Eupithecia denticulata (Treitschke, 1828)
Eupithecia distinctaria Herrich-Schäffer, 1848
Eupithecia dodoneata Guenee, 1858
Eupithecia druentiata Dietze, 1902
Eupithecia egenaria Herrich-Schäffer, 1848
Eupithecia ericeata (Rambur, 1833)
Eupithecia extraversaria Herrich-Schäffer, 1852
Eupithecia extremata (Fabricius, 1787)
Eupithecia gemellata Herrich-Schäffer, 1861
Eupithecia graphata (Treitschke, 1828)
Eupithecia gratiosata Herrich-Schäffer, 1861
Eupithecia gueneata Milliere, 1862
Eupithecia haworthiata Doubleday, 1856
Eupithecia icterata (de Villers, 1789)
Eupithecia impurata (Hübner, 1813)
Eupithecia indigata (Hübner, 1813)
Eupithecia innotata (Hufnagel, 1767)
Eupithecia insigniata (Hübner, 1790)
Eupithecia intricata (Zetterstedt, 1839)
Eupithecia inturbata (Hübner, 1817)
Eupithecia irriguata (Hübner, 1813)
Eupithecia laquaearia Herrich-Schäffer, 1848
Eupithecia limbata Staudinger, 1879
Eupithecia linariata (Denis & Schiffermüller, 1775)
Eupithecia millefoliata Rossler, 1866
Eupithecia nanata (Hübner, 1813)
Eupithecia ochridata Schutze & Pinker, 1968
Eupithecia orphnata W. Petersen, 1909
Eupithecia oxycedrata (Rambur, 1833)
Eupithecia pimpinellata (Hübner, 1813)
Eupithecia plumbeolata (Haworth, 1809)
Eupithecia pusillata (Denis & Schiffermüller, 1775)
Eupithecia pyreneata Mabille, 1871
Eupithecia quercetica Prout, 1938
Eupithecia satyrata (Hübner, 1813)
Eupithecia schiefereri Bohatsch, 1893
Eupithecia selinata Herrich-Schäffer, 1861
Eupithecia semigraphata Bruand, 1850
Eupithecia silenata Assmann, 1848
Eupithecia silenicolata Mabille, 1867
Eupithecia simpliciata (Haworth, 1809)
Eupithecia spissilineata (Metzner, 1846)
Eupithecia subfuscata (Haworth, 1809)
Eupithecia subumbrata (Denis & Schiffermüller, 1775)
Eupithecia succenturiata (Linnaeus, 1758)
Eupithecia tantillaria Boisduval, 1840
Eupithecia tenuiata (Hübner, 1813)
Eupithecia thurnerata Schutze, 1958
Eupithecia tripunctaria Herrich-Schäffer, 1852
Eupithecia trisignaria Herrich-Schäffer, 1848
Eupithecia undata (Freyer, 1840)
Eupithecia variostrigata Alphéraky, 1876
Eupithecia venosata (Fabricius, 1787)
Eupithecia veratraria Herrich-Schäffer, 1848
Eupithecia virgaureata Doubleday, 1861
Eupithecia vulgata (Haworth, 1809)
Eustroma reticulata (Denis & Schiffermüller, 1775)
Fagivorina arenaria (Hufnagel, 1767)
Gandaritis pyraliata (Denis & Schiffermüller, 1775)
Geometra papilionaria (Linnaeus, 1758)
Glacies coracina (Esper, 1805)
Gnopharmia stevenaria (Boisduval, 1840)
Gnophos sartata Treitschke, 1827
Gnophos furvata (Denis & Schiffermüller, 1775)
Gnophos obfuscata (Denis & Schiffermüller, 1775)
Gymnoscelis rufifasciata (Haworth, 1809)
Gypsochroa renitidata (Hübner, 1817)
Heliomata glarearia (Denis & Schiffermüller, 1775)
Hemistola chrysoprasaria (Esper, 1795)
Hemithea aestivaria (Hübner, 1789)
Horisme calligraphata (Herrich-Schäffer, 1838)
Horisme corticata (Treitschke, 1835)
Horisme radicaria (de La Harpe, 1855)
Horisme tersata (Denis & Schiffermüller, 1775)
Horisme vitalbata (Denis & Schiffermüller, 1775)
Hydrelia flammeolaria (Hufnagel, 1767)
Hydria undulata (Linnaeus, 1758)
Hydriomena furcata (Thunberg, 1784)
Hydriomena impluviata (Denis & Schiffermüller, 1775)
Hydriomena ruberata (Freyer, 1831)
Hylaea fasciaria (Linnaeus, 1758)
Hypomecis punctinalis (Scopoli, 1763)
Hypomecis roboraria (Denis & Schiffermüller, 1775)
Hypoxystis pluviaria (Fabricius, 1787)
Idaea albitorquata (Pungeler, 1909)
Idaea aureolaria (Denis & Schiffermüller, 1775)
Idaea aversata (Linnaeus, 1758)
Idaea biselata (Hufnagel, 1767)
Idaea camparia (Herrich-Schäffer, 1852)
Idaea circuitaria (Hübner, 1819)
Idaea consanguinaria (Lederer, 1853)
Idaea consolidata (Lederer, 1853)
Idaea contiguaria (Hübner, 1799)
Idaea degeneraria (Hübner, 1799)
Idaea determinata (Staudinger, 1876)
Idaea deversaria (Herrich-Schäffer, 1847)
Idaea dilutaria (Hübner, 1799)
Idaea dimidiata (Hufnagel, 1767)
Idaea distinctaria (Boisduval, 1840)
Idaea elongaria (Rambur, 1833)
Idaea emarginata (Linnaeus, 1758)
Idaea filicata (Hübner, 1799)
Idaea fuscovenosa (Goeze, 1781)
Idaea humiliata (Hufnagel, 1767)
Idaea inquinata (Scopoli, 1763)
Idaea laevigata (Scopoli, 1763)
Idaea metohiensis (Rebel, 1900)
Idaea moniliata (Denis & Schiffermüller, 1775)
Idaea obsoletaria (Rambur, 1833)
Idaea ochrata (Scopoli, 1763)
Idaea ostrinaria (Hübner, 1813)
Idaea pallidata (Denis & Schiffermüller, 1775)
Idaea politaria (Hübner, 1799)
Idaea rubraria (Staudinger, 1901)
Idaea rufaria (Hübner, 1799)
Idaea rusticata (Denis & Schiffermüller, 1775)
Idaea seriata (Schrank, 1802)
Idaea serpentata (Hufnagel, 1767)
Idaea spissilimbaria (Mabille, 1888)
Idaea straminata (Borkhausen, 1794)
Idaea subsericeata (Haworth, 1809)
Idaea sylvestraria (Hübner, 1799)
Idaea trigeminata (Haworth, 1809)
Isturgia arenacearia (Denis & Schiffermüller, 1775)
Isturgia murinaria (Denis & Schiffermüller, 1775)
Isturgia roraria (Fabricius, 1776)
Jodis lactearia (Linnaeus, 1758)
Lampropteryx suffumata (Denis & Schiffermüller, 1775)
Larentia clavaria (Haworth, 1809)
Ligdia adustata (Denis & Schiffermüller, 1775)
Lignyoptera fumidaria (Hübner, 1825)
Lithostege farinata (Hufnagel, 1767)
Lithostege griseata (Denis & Schiffermüller, 1775)
Lobophora halterata (Hufnagel, 1767)
Lomaspilis marginata (Linnaeus, 1758)
Lomographa bimaculata (Fabricius, 1775)
Lomographa temerata (Denis & Schiffermüller, 1775)
Lycia graecarius (Staudinger, 1861)
Lycia hirtaria (Clerck, 1759)
Lythria cruentaria (Hufnagel, 1767)
Lythria purpuraria (Linnaeus, 1758)
Macaria alternata (Denis & Schiffermüller, 1775)
Macaria artesiaria (Denis & Schiffermüller, 1775)
Macaria liturata (Clerck, 1759)
Macaria notata (Linnaeus, 1758)
Macaria wauaria (Linnaeus, 1758)
Martania taeniata (Stephens, 1831)
Melanthia alaudaria (Freyer, 1846)
Melanthia procellata (Denis & Schiffermüller, 1775)
Menophra abruptaria (Thunberg, 1792)
Mesoleuca albicillata (Linnaeus, 1758)
Mesotype didymata (Linnaeus, 1758)
Mesotype parallelolineata (Retzius, 1783)
Mesotype verberata (Scopoli, 1763)
Microloxia herbaria (Hübner, 1813)
Minoa murinata (Scopoli, 1763)
Narraga fasciolaria (Hufnagel, 1767)
Narraga tessularia (Metzner, 1845)
Nebula achromaria (de La Harpe, 1853)
Nebula nebulata (Treitschke, 1828)
Nebula senectaria (Herrich-Schäffer, 1852)
Nothocasis sertata (Hübner, 1817)
Nychiodes amygdalaria (Herrich-Schäffer, 1848)
Nychiodes dalmatina Wagner, 1909
Nychiodes waltheri Wagner, 1919
Nycterosea obstipata (Fabricius, 1794)
Odezia atrata (Linnaeus, 1758)
Odontopera bidentata (Clerck, 1759)
Odontopera graecarius (A. Bang-Haas, 1910)
Operophtera brumata (Linnaeus, 1758)
Operophtera fagata (Scharfenberg, 1805)
Opisthograptis luteolata (Linnaeus, 1758)
Orthostixis cribraria (Hübner, 1799)
Oulobophora externaria (Herrich-Schäffer, 1848)
Oulobophora internata (Pungeler, 1888)
Ourapteryx sambucaria (Linnaeus, 1758)
Paraboarmia viertlii (Bohatsch, 1883)
Paradarisa consonaria (Hübner, 1799)
Parectropis similaria (Hufnagel, 1767)
Pareulype berberata (Denis & Schiffermüller, 1775)
Pasiphila chloerata (Mabille, 1870)
Pasiphila rectangulata (Linnaeus, 1758)
Pelurga comitata (Linnaeus, 1758)
Pennithera firmata (Hübner, 1822)
Pennithera ulicata (Rambur, 1934)
Perconia strigillaria (Hübner, 1787)
Peribatodes correptaria (Zeller, 1847)
Peribatodes rhomboidaria (Denis & Schiffermüller, 1775)
Peribatodes secundaria (Denis & Schiffermüller, 1775)
Peribatodes umbraria (Hübner, 1809)
Perizoma affinitata (Stephens, 1831)
Perizoma albulata (Denis & Schiffermüller, 1775)
Perizoma alchemillata (Linnaeus, 1758)
Perizoma bifaciata (Haworth, 1809)
Perizoma blandiata (Denis & Schiffermüller, 1775)
Perizoma flavofasciata (Thunberg, 1792)
Perizoma hydrata (Treitschke, 1829)
Perizoma lugdunaria (Herrich-Schäffer, 1855)
Perizoma minorata (Treitschke, 1828)
Perizoma obsoletata (Herrich-Schäffer, 1838)
Petrophora chlorosata (Scopoli, 1763)
Phaiogramma etruscaria (Zeller, 1849)
Phibalapteryx virgata (Hufnagel, 1767)
Phigalia pilosaria (Denis & Schiffermüller, 1775)
Philereme transversata (Hufnagel, 1767)
Philereme vetulata (Denis & Schiffermüller, 1775)
Plagodis dolabraria (Linnaeus, 1767)
Plagodis pulveraria (Linnaeus, 1758)
Proteuchloris neriaria (Herrich-Schäffer, 1852)
Protorhoe corollaria (Herrich-Schäffer, 1848)
Protorhoe unicata (Guenee, 1858)
Pseudopanthera macularia (Linnaeus, 1758)
Pseudoterpna pruinata (Hufnagel, 1767)
Pungeleria capreolaria (Denis & Schiffermüller, 1775)
Rheumaptera hastata (Linnaeus, 1758)
Rheumaptera subhastata (Nolcken, 1870)
Rhodometra sacraria (Linnaeus, 1767)
Rhodostrophia calabra (Petagna, 1786)
Rhodostrophia discopunctata Amsel, 1935
Rhodostrophia vibicaria (Clerck, 1759)
Rhoptria asperaria (Hübner, 1817)
Schistostege decussata (Denis & Schiffermüller, 1775)
Scopula beckeraria (Lederer, 1853)
Scopula confinaria (Herrich-Schäffer, 1847)
Scopula drenowskii Sterneck, 1941
Scopula flaccidaria (Zeller, 1852)
Scopula floslactata (Haworth, 1809)
Scopula imitaria (Hübner, 1799)
Scopula immistaria (Herrich-Schäffer, 1852)
Scopula immutata (Linnaeus, 1758)
Scopula incanata (Linnaeus, 1758)
Scopula marginepunctata (Goeze, 1781)
Scopula minorata (Boisduval, 1833)
Scopula subpunctaria (Herrich-Schäffer, 1847)
Scopula ternata Schrank, 1802
Scopula corrivalaria (Kretschmar, 1862)
Scopula decorata (Denis & Schiffermüller, 1775)
Scopula immorata (Linnaeus, 1758)
Scopula nigropunctata (Hufnagel, 1767)
Scopula ochraceata (Staudinger, 1901)
Scopula orientalis (Alphéraky, 1876)
Scopula ornata (Scopoli, 1763)
Scopula rubiginata (Hufnagel, 1767)
Scopula submutata (Treitschke, 1828)
Scopula tessellaria (Boisduval, 1840)
Scotopteryx bipunctaria (Denis & Schiffermüller, 1775)
Scotopteryx chenopodiata (Linnaeus, 1758)
Scotopteryx coarctaria (Denis & Schiffermüller, 1775)
Scotopteryx ignorata Huemer & Hausmann, 1998
Scotopteryx luridata (Hufnagel, 1767)
Scotopteryx moeniata (Scopoli, 1763)
Scotopteryx mucronata (Scopoli, 1763)
Scotopteryx vicinaria (Duponchel, 1830)
Selenia dentaria (Fabricius, 1775)
Selenia lunularia (Hübner, 1788)
Selenia tetralunaria (Hufnagel, 1767)
Siona lineata (Scopoli, 1763)
Spargania luctuata (Denis & Schiffermüller, 1775)
Stegania dilectaria (Hübner, 1790)
Synopsia sociaria (Hübner, 1799)
Tephronia oranaria Staudinger, 1892
Tephronia sepiaria (Hufnagel, 1767)
Thalera fimbrialis (Scopoli, 1763)
Thera britannica (Turner, 1925)
Thera cognata (Thunberg, 1792)
Thera juniperata (Linnaeus, 1758)
Thera obeliscata (Hübner, 1787)
Thera variata (Denis & Schiffermüller, 1775)
Thera vetustata (Denis & Schiffermüller, 1775)
Therapis flavicaria (Denis & Schiffermüller, 1775)
Theria rupicapraria (Denis & Schiffermüller, 1775)
Thetidia smaragdaria (Fabricius, 1787)
Timandra comae Schmidt, 1931
Trichopteryx carpinata (Borkhausen, 1794)
Trichopteryx polycommata (Denis & Schiffermüller, 1775)
Triphosa dubitata (Linnaeus, 1758)
Triphosa sabaudiata (Duponchel, 1830)
Venusia blomeri (Curtis, 1832)
Venusia cambrica Curtis, 1839
Xanthorhoe biriviata (Borkhausen, 1794)
Xanthorhoe decoloraria (Esper, 1806)
Xanthorhoe designata (Hufnagel, 1767)
Xanthorhoe ferrugata (Clerck, 1759)
Xanthorhoe fluctuata (Linnaeus, 1758)
Xanthorhoe montanata (Denis & Schiffermüller, 1775)
Xanthorhoe quadrifasiata (Clerck, 1759)
Xanthorhoe spadicearia (Denis & Schiffermüller, 1775)

Glyphipterigidae
Acrolepia autumnitella Curtis, 1838
Acrolepiopsis marcidella (Curtis, 1850)
Digitivalva perlepidella (Stainton, 1849)
Digitivalva reticulella (Hübner, 1796)
Digitivalva granitella (Treitschke, 1833)
Digitivalva pulicariae (Klimesch, 1956)
Glyphipterix equitella (Scopoli, 1763)
Glyphipterix fuscoviridella (Haworth, 1828)
Glyphipterix schoenicolella Boyd, 1859

Gracillariidae
Acrocercops brongniardella (Fabricius, 1798)
Aspilapteryx limosella (Duponchel, 1843)
Aspilapteryx tringipennella (Zeller, 1839)
Callisto denticulella (Thunberg, 1794)
Caloptilia elongella (Linnaeus, 1761)
Caloptilia semifascia (Haworth, 1828)
Calybites phasianipennella (Hübner, 1813)
Cameraria ohridella Deschka & Dimic, 1986
Cupedia cupediella (Herrich-Schäffer, 1855)
Dialectica soffneri (Gregor & Povolny, 1965)
Gracillaria syringella (Fabricius, 1794)
Leucospilapteryx omissella (Stainton, 1848)
Micrurapteryx kollariella (Zeller, 1839)
Parornix anglicella (Stainton, 1850)
Parornix carpinella (Frey, 1863)
Parornix devoniella (Stainton, 1850)
Parornix fagivora (Frey, 1861)
Parornix scoticella (Stainton, 1850)
Phyllocnistis valentinensis M. Hering, 1936
Phyllonorycter abrasella (Duponchel, 1843)
Phyllonorycter acaciella (Duponchel, 1843)
Phyllonorycter acerifoliella (Zeller, 1839)
Phyllonorycter agilella (Zeller, 1846)
Phyllonorycter blancardella (Fabricius, 1781)
Phyllonorycter cerasicolella (Herrich-Schäffer, 1855)
Phyllonorycter cerasinella (Reutti, 1852)
Phyllonorycter comparella (Duponchel, 1843)
Phyllonorycter coryli (Nicelli, 1851)
Phyllonorycter corylifoliella (Hübner, 1796)
Phyllonorycter delitella (Duponchel, 1843)
Phyllonorycter dubitella (Herrich-Schäffer, 1855)
Phyllonorycter emberizaepenella (Bouche, 1834)
Phyllonorycter esperella (Goeze, 1783)
Phyllonorycter froelichiella (Zeller, 1839)
Phyllonorycter geniculella (Ragonot, 1874)
Phyllonorycter harrisella (Linnaeus, 1761)
Phyllonorycter heegeriella (Zeller, 1846)
Phyllonorycter insignitella (Zeller, 1846)
Phyllonorycter joannisi (Le Marchand, 1936)
Phyllonorycter junoniella (Zeller, 1846)
Phyllonorycter klemannella (Fabricius, 1781)
Phyllonorycter lautella (Zeller, 1846)
Phyllonorycter maestingella (Muller, 1764)
Phyllonorycter mannii (Zeller, 1846)
Phyllonorycter medicaginella (Gerasimov, 1930)
Phyllonorycter messaniella (Zeller, 1846)
Phyllonorycter millierella (Staudinger, 1871)
Phyllonorycter nicellii (Stainton, 1851)
Phyllonorycter oxyacanthae (Frey, 1856)
Phyllonorycter pastorella (Zeller, 1846)
Phyllonorycter platani (Staudinger, 1870)
Phyllonorycter populifoliella (Treitschke, 1833)
Phyllonorycter pyrifoliella (Gerasimov, 1933)
Phyllonorycter quercifoliella (Zeller, 1839)
Phyllonorycter rajella (Linnaeus, 1758)
Phyllonorycter roboris (Zeller, 1839)
Phyllonorycter salictella (Zeller, 1846)
Phyllonorycter schreberella (Fabricius, 1781)
Phyllonorycter scitulella (Duponchel, 1843)
Phyllonorycter spinicolella (Zeller, 1846)
Phyllonorycter staintoniella (Nicelli, 1853)
Phyllonorycter stettinensis (Nicelli, 1852)
Phyllonorycter strigulatella (Lienig & Zeller, 1846)
Phyllonorycter suberifoliella (Zeller, 1850)
Phyllonorycter tenerella (de Joannis, 1915)
Phyllonorycter ulmifoliella (Hübner, 1817)

Heliozelidae
Antispila treitschkiella (Fischer von Röslerstamm, 1843)

Hepialidae
Hepialus humuli (Linnaeus, 1758)
Pharmacis fusconebulosa (DeGeer, 1778)
Pharmacis lupulina (Linnaeus, 1758)
Phymatopus hecta (Linnaeus, 1758)
Triodia amasinus (Herrich-Schäffer, 1851)
Triodia sylvina (Linnaeus, 1761)

Incurvariidae
Incurvaria masculella (Denis & Schiffermüller, 1775)
Incurvaria oehlmanniella (Hübner, 1796)
Incurvaria vetulella (Zetterstedt, 1839)

Lasiocampidae
Dendrolimus pini (Linnaeus, 1758)
Eriogaster catax (Linnaeus, 1758)
Eriogaster lanestris (Linnaeus, 1758)
Eriogaster rimicola (Denis & Schiffermüller, 1775)
Gastropacha quercifolia (Linnaeus, 1758)
Gastropacha populifolia (Denis & Schiffermüller, 1775)
Lasiocampa quercus (Linnaeus, 1758)
Lasiocampa grandis (Rogenhofer, 1891)
Lasiocampa eversmanni (Eversmann, 1843)
Lasiocampa trifolii (Denis & Schiffermüller, 1775)
Macrothylacia rubi (Linnaeus, 1758)
Malacosoma castrensis (Linnaeus, 1758)
Malacosoma neustria (Linnaeus, 1758)
Malacosoma franconica (Denis & Schiffermüller, 1775)
Odonestis pruni (Linnaeus, 1758)
Pachypasa otus (Drury, 1773)
Phyllodesma ilicifolia (Linnaeus, 1758)
Phyllodesma tremulifolia (Hübner, 1810)
Poecilocampa alpina (Frey & Wullschlegel, 1874)
Poecilocampa populi (Linnaeus, 1758)
Trichiura crataegi (Linnaeus, 1758)
Trichiura verenae Witt, 1981

Lecithoceridae
Ceuthomadarus viduellus Rebel, 1903
Eurodachtha flavissimella (Mann, 1862)
Lecithocera nigrana (Duponchel, 1836)

Limacodidae
Apoda limacodes (Hufnagel, 1766)
Heterogenea asella (Denis & Schiffermüller, 1775)

Lyonetiidae
Leucoptera aceris (Fuchs, 1903)
Leucoptera cytisiphagella Klimesch, 1938
Leucoptera genistae (M. Hering, 1933)
Leucoptera heringiella Toll, 1938
Leucoptera laburnella (Stainton, 1851)
Leucoptera malifoliella (O. Costa, 1836)
Leucoptera sinuella (Reutti, 1853)
Lyonetia clerkella (Linnaeus, 1758)

Lypusidae
Lypusa tokari Elsner, Liska & Petru, 2008
Pseudatemelia flavifrontella (Denis & Schiffermüller, 1775)

Micropterigidae
Micropterix allionella (Fabricius, 1794)
Micropterix corcyrella Walsingham, 1919
Micropterix myrtetella Zeller, 1850
Micropterix schaefferi Heath, 1975

Momphidae
Mompha langiella (Hübner, 1796)
Mompha idaei (Zeller, 1839)
Mompha miscella (Denis & Schiffermüller, 1775)
Mompha epilobiella (Denis & Schiffermüller, 1775)
Mompha ochraceella (Curtis, 1839)
Mompha locupletella (Denis & Schiffermüller, 1775)

Nepticulidae
Acalyptris platani (Muller-Rutz, 1934)
Bohemannia pulverosella (Stainton, 1849)
Ectoedemia agrimoniae (Frey, 1858)
Ectoedemia albifasciella (Heinemann, 1871)
Ectoedemia angulifasciella (Stainton, 1849)
Ectoedemia arcuatella (Herrich-Schäffer, 1855)
Ectoedemia argyropeza (Zeller, 1839)
Ectoedemia caradjai (Groschke, 1944)
Ectoedemia hannoverella (Glitz, 1872)
Ectoedemia mahalebella (Klimesch, 1936)
Ectoedemia occultella (Linnaeus, 1767)
Ectoedemia preisseckeri (Klimesch, 1941)
Ectoedemia spinosella (de Joannis, 1908)
Ectoedemia turbidella (Zeller, 1848)
Ectoedemia decentella (Herrich-Schäffer, 1855)
Ectoedemia septembrella (Stainton, 1849)
Ectoedemia amani Svensson, 1966
Ectoedemia liebwerdella Zimmermann, 1940
Ectoedemia longicaudella Klimesch, 1953
Parafomoria helianthemella (Herrich-Schäffer, 1860)
Simplimorpha promissa (Staudinger, 1871)
Stigmella aceris (Frey, 1857)
Stigmella aeneofasciella (Herrich-Schäffer, 1855)
Stigmella anomalella (Goeze, 1783)
Stigmella assimilella (Zeller, 1848)
Stigmella atricapitella (Haworth, 1828)
Stigmella aurella (Fabricius, 1775)
Stigmella basiguttella (Heinemann, 1862)
Stigmella carpinella (Heinemann, 1862)
Stigmella catharticella (Stainton, 1853)
Stigmella centifoliella (Zeller, 1848)
Stigmella confusella (Wood & Walsingham, 1894)
Stigmella desperatella (Frey, 1856)
Stigmella floslactella (Haworth, 1828)
Stigmella freyella (Heyden, 1858)
Stigmella hemargyrella (Kollar, 1832)
Stigmella hybnerella (Hübner, 1796)
Stigmella johanssonella A. & Z. Lastuvka, 1997
Stigmella lemniscella (Zeller, 1839)
Stigmella lonicerarum (Frey, 1856)
Stigmella magdalenae (Klimesch, 1950)
Stigmella malella (Stainton, 1854)
Stigmella microtheriella (Stainton, 1854)
Stigmella minusculella (Herrich-Schäffer, 1855)
Stigmella myrtillella (Stainton, 1857)
Stigmella obliquella (Heinemann, 1862)
Stigmella oxyacanthella (Stainton, 1854)
Stigmella paliurella Gerasimov, 1937
Stigmella paradoxa (Frey, 1858)
Stigmella perpygmaeella (Doubleday, 1859)
Stigmella plagicolella (Stainton, 1854)
Stigmella prunetorum (Stainton, 1855)
Stigmella pyri (Glitz, 1865)
Stigmella salicis (Stainton, 1854)
Stigmella sorbi (Stainton, 1861)
Stigmella speciosa (Frey, 1858)
Stigmella splendidissimella (Herrich-Schäffer, 1855)
Stigmella tiliae (Frey, 1856)
Stigmella tityrella (Stainton, 1854)
Stigmella trimaculella (Haworth, 1828)
Stigmella ulmivora (Fologne, 1860)
Stigmella viscerella (Stainton, 1853)
Trifurcula cryptella (Stainton, 1856)
Trifurcula subnitidella (Duponchel, 1843)

Noctuidae
Abrostola agnorista Dufay, 1956
Abrostola asclepiadis (Denis & Schiffermüller, 1775)
Abrostola clarissa (Staudinger, 1900)
Abrostola tripartita (Hufnagel, 1766)
Abrostola triplasia (Linnaeus, 1758)
Acontia lucida (Hufnagel, 1766)
Acontia candefacta (Hübner, 1831)
Acontia trabealis (Scopoli, 1763)
Acontia melanura (Tauscher, 1809)
Acontia titania (Esper, 1798)
Acronicta aceris (Linnaeus, 1758)
Acronicta leporina (Linnaeus, 1758)
Acronicta strigosa (Denis & Schiffermüller, 1775)
Acronicta alni (Linnaeus, 1767)
Acronicta cuspis (Hübner, 1813)
Acronicta psi (Linnaeus, 1758)
Acronicta tridens (Denis & Schiffermüller, 1775)
Acronicta auricoma (Denis & Schiffermüller, 1775)
Acronicta euphorbiae (Denis & Schiffermüller, 1775)
Acronicta orientalis (Mann, 1862)
Acronicta rumicis (Linnaeus, 1758)
Actebia praecox (Linnaeus, 1758)
Actebia fugax (Treitschke, 1825)
Actinotia polyodon (Clerck, 1759)
Actinotia radiosa (Esper, 1804)
Aedia funesta (Esper, 1786)
Aedia leucomelas (Linnaeus, 1758)
Aedophron rhodites (Eversmann, 1851)
Aegle kaekeritziana (Hübner, 1799)
Aegle pallida (Staudinger, 1892)
Aegle semicana (Esper, 1798)
Agrochola lychnidis (Denis & Schiffermüller, 1775)
Agrochola deleta (Staudinger, 1882)
Agrochola gratiosa (Staudinger, 1882)
Agrochola helvola (Linnaeus, 1758)
Agrochola humilis (Denis & Schiffermüller, 1775)
Agrochola kindermannii (Fischer v. Röslerstamm, 1837)
Agrochola litura (Linnaeus, 1758)
Agrochola nitida (Denis & Schiffermüller, 1775)
Agrochola osthelderi Boursin, 1951
Agrochola rupicapra (Staudinger, 1879)
Agrochola thurneri Boursin, 1953
Agrochola lota (Clerck, 1759)
Agrochola macilenta (Hübner, 1809)
Agrochola laevis (Hübner, 1803)
Agrochola circellaris (Hufnagel, 1766)
Agrotis bigramma (Esper, 1790)
Agrotis catalaunensis (Milliere, 1873)
Agrotis cinerea (Denis & Schiffermüller, 1775)
Agrotis clavis (Hufnagel, 1766)
Agrotis desertorum Boisduval, 1840
Agrotis exclamationis (Linnaeus, 1758)
Agrotis fatidica (Hübner, 1824)
Agrotis ipsilon (Hufnagel, 1766)
Agrotis obesa Boisduval, 1829
Agrotis puta (Hübner, 1803)
Agrotis ripae Hübner, 1823
Agrotis segetum (Denis & Schiffermüller, 1775)
Agrotis spinifera (Hübner, 1808)
Agrotis trux (Hübner, 1824)
Agrotis vestigialis (Hufnagel, 1766)
Allophyes oxyacanthae (Linnaeus, 1758)
Amephana dalmatica (Rebel, 1919)
Ammoconia caecimacula (Denis & Schiffermüller, 1775)
Ammoconia senex (Geyer, 1828)
Amphipoea oculea (Linnaeus, 1761)
Amphipyra berbera Rungs, 1949
Amphipyra effusa Boisduval, 1828
Amphipyra livida (Denis & Schiffermüller, 1775)
Amphipyra micans Lederer, 1857
Amphipyra pyramidea (Linnaeus, 1758)
Amphipyra stix Herrich-Schäffer, 1850
Amphipyra tetra (Fabricius, 1787)
Amphipyra tragopoginis (Clerck, 1759)
Amphipyra cinnamomea (Goeze, 1781)
Anaplectoides prasina (Denis & Schiffermüller, 1775)
Anarta dianthi (Tauscher, 1809)
Anarta melanopa (Thunberg, 1791)
Anarta mendax (Staudinger, 1879)
Anarta odontites (Boisduval, 1829)
Anarta stigmosa (Christoph, 1887)
Anarta trifolii (Hufnagel, 1766)
Anorthoa munda (Denis & Schiffermüller, 1775)
Anthracia eriopoda (Herrich-Schäffer, 1851)
Antitype chi (Linnaeus, 1758)
Antitype suda (Geyer, 1832)
Apamea anceps (Denis & Schiffermüller, 1775)
Apamea aquila Donzel, 1837
Apamea crenata (Hufnagel, 1766)
Apamea epomidion (Haworth, 1809)
Apamea furva (Denis & Schiffermüller, 1775)
Apamea illyria Freyer, 1846
Apamea lateritia (Hufnagel, 1766)
Apamea lithoxylaea (Denis & Schiffermüller, 1775)
Apamea maillardi (Geyer, 1834)
Apamea michielii Varga, 1976
Apamea monoglypha (Hufnagel, 1766)
Apamea oblonga (Haworth, 1809)
Apamea remissa (Hübner, 1809)
Apamea rubrirena (Treitschke, 1825)
Apamea scolopacina (Esper, 1788)
Apamea sicula (Turati, 1909)
Apamea sordens (Hufnagel, 1766)
Apamea sublustris (Esper, 1788)
Apamea syriaca (Osthelder, 1933)
Apamea unanimis (Hübner, 1813)
Apamea zeta (Treitschke, 1825)
Apaustis rupicola (Denis & Schiffermüller, 1775)
Aporophyla australis (Boisduval, 1829)
Aporophyla canescens (Duponchel, 1826)
Aporophyla lutulenta (Denis & Schiffermüller, 1775)
Aporophyla nigra (Haworth, 1809)
Apterogenum ypsillon (Denis & Schiffermüller, 1775)
Archanara dissoluta (Treitschke, 1825)
Archanara neurica (Hübner, 1808)
Arenostola phragmitidis (Hübner, 1803)
Asteroscopus sphinx (Hufnagel, 1766)
Asteroscopus syriaca (Warren, 1910)
Atethmia ambusta (Denis & Schiffermüller, 1775)
Atethmia centrago (Haworth, 1809)
Athetis furvula (Hübner, 1808)
Athetis gluteosa (Treitschke, 1835)
Athetis pallustris (Hübner, 1808)
Athetis hospes (Freyer, 1831)
Athetis lepigone (Moschler, 1860)
Atypha pulmonaris (Esper, 1790)
Auchmis detersa (Esper, 1787)
Autographa bractea (Denis & Schiffermüller, 1775)
Autographa gamma (Linnaeus, 1758)
Autographa jota (Linnaeus, 1758)
Autographa pulchrina (Haworth, 1809)
Axylia putris (Linnaeus, 1761)
Behounekia freyeri (Frivaldszky, 1835)
Brachionycha nubeculosa (Esper, 1785)
Brachylomia viminalis (Fabricius, 1776)
Bryophila ereptricula Treitschke, 1825
Bryophila felina (Eversmann, 1852)
Bryophila petricolor Lederer, 1870
Bryophila raptricula (Denis & Schiffermüller, 1775)
Bryophila ravula (Hübner, 1813)
Bryophila rectilinea (Warren, 1909)
Bryophila seladona Christoph, 1885
Bryophila tephrocharis (Boursin, 1953)
Bryophila domestica (Hufnagel, 1766)
Bryophila petrea Guenee, 1852
Calamia tridens (Hufnagel, 1766)
Calliergis ramosa (Esper, 1786)
Callopistria juventina (Stoll, 1782)
Callopistria latreillei (Duponchel, 1827)
Calophasia barthae Wagner, 1929
Calophasia lunula (Hufnagel, 1766)
Calophasia opalina (Esper, 1793)
Calophasia platyptera (Esper, 1788)
Caradrina morpheus (Hufnagel, 1766)
Caradrina gilva (Donzel, 1837)
Caradrina pertinax Staudinger, 1879
Caradrina vicina Staudinger, 1870
Caradrina clavipalpis Scopoli, 1763
Caradrina flavirena Guenee, 1852
Caradrina selini Boisduval, 1840
Caradrina suscianja (Mentzer, 1981)
Caradrina wullschlegeli Pungeler, 1903
Caradrina aspersa Rambur, 1834
Caradrina kadenii Freyer, 1836
Caradrina terrea Freyer, 1840
Ceramica pisi (Linnaeus, 1758)
Cerapteryx graminis (Linnaeus, 1758)
Cerastis leucographa (Denis & Schiffermüller, 1775)
Cerastis rubricosa (Denis & Schiffermüller, 1775)
Cervyna cervago Eversmann, 1844
Charanyca trigrammica (Hufnagel, 1766)
Charanyca apfelbecki (Rebel, 1901)
Charanyca ferruginea (Esper, 1785)
Chersotis alpestris (Boisduval, 1837)
Chersotis anatolica (Draudt, 1936)
Chersotis andereggii (Boisduval, 1832)
Chersotis cuprea (Denis & Schiffermüller, 1775)
Chersotis elegans (Eversmann, 1837)
Chersotis fimbriola (Esper, 1803)
Chersotis laeta (Rebel, 1904)
Chersotis margaritacea (Villers, 1789)
Chersotis multangula (Hübner, 1803)
Chersotis rectangula (Denis & Schiffermüller, 1775)
Chilodes maritima (Tauscher, 1806)
Chloantha hyperici (Denis & Schiffermüller, 1775)
Chrysodeixis chalcites (Esper, 1789)
Cleoceris scoriacea (Esper, 1789)
Cleonymia opposita (Lederer, 1870)
Colocasia coryli (Linnaeus, 1758)
Conisania renati (Oberthur, 1890)
Conisania luteago (Denis & Schiffermüller, 1775)
Conistra ligula (Esper, 1791)
Conistra rubiginosa (Scopoli, 1763)
Conistra vaccinii (Linnaeus, 1761)
Conistra veronicae (Hübner, 1813)
Conistra erythrocephala (Denis & Schiffermüller, 1775)
Conistra rubiginea (Denis & Schiffermüller, 1775)
Conistra ragusae (Failla-Tedaldi, 1890)
Conistra torrida (Lederer, 1857)
Coranarta cordigera (Thunberg, 1788)
Cornutiplusia circumflexa (Linnaeus, 1767)
Cosmia trapezina (Linnaeus, 1758)
Cosmia diffinis (Linnaeus, 1767)
Cosmia pyralina (Denis & Schiffermüller, 1775)
Cosmia confinis Herrich-Schäffer, 1849
Cosmia affinis (Linnaeus, 1767)
Craniophora ligustri (Denis & Schiffermüller, 1775)
Craniophora pontica (Staudinger, 1878)
Cryphia fraudatricula (Hübner, 1803)
Cryphia receptricula (Hübner, 1803)
Cryphia algae (Fabricius, 1775)
Cryphia ochsi (Boursin, 1940)
Ctenoplusia accentifera (Lefebvre, 1827)
Cucullia celsiae Herrich-Schäffer, 1850
Cucullia absinthii (Linnaeus, 1761)
Cucullia artemisiae (Hufnagel, 1766)
Cucullia asteris (Denis & Schiffermüller, 1775)
Cucullia balsamitae Boisduval, 1840
Cucullia biornata Fischer von Waldheim, 1840
Cucullia chamomillae (Denis & Schiffermüller, 1775)
Cucullia formosa Rogenhofer, 1860
Cucullia lactucae (Denis & Schiffermüller, 1775)
Cucullia lucifuga (Denis & Schiffermüller, 1775)
Cucullia pustulata Eversmann, 1842
Cucullia santonici (Hübner, 1813)
Cucullia scopariae Dorfmeister, 1853
Cucullia tanaceti (Denis & Schiffermüller, 1775)
Cucullia umbratica (Linnaeus, 1758)
Cucullia xeranthemi Boisduval, 1840
Cucullia blattariae (Esper, 1790)
Cucullia gozmanyi (G. Ronkay & L. Ronkay, 1994)
Cucullia lanceolata (Villers, 1789)
Cucullia lychnitis Rambur, 1833
Cucullia prenanthis Boisduval, 1840
Cucullia scrophulariae (Denis & Schiffermüller, 1775)
Cucullia verbasci (Linnaeus, 1758)
Dasypolia ferdinandi Ruhl, 1892
Dasypolia templi (Thunberg, 1792)
Deltote bankiana (Fabricius, 1775)
Deltote uncula (Clerck, 1759)
Deltote pygarga (Hufnagel, 1766)
Denticucullus pygmina (Haworth, 1809)
Diachrysia chrysitis (Linnaeus, 1758)
Diachrysia chryson (Esper, 1789)
Diachrysia nadeja (Oberthur, 1880)
Diachrysia stenochrysis (Warren, 1913)
Diachrysia zosimi (Hübner, 1822)
Diarsia brunnea (Denis & Schiffermüller, 1775)
Diarsia mendica (Fabricius, 1775)
Diarsia rubi (Vieweg, 1790)
Dichagyris flammatra (Denis & Schiffermüller, 1775)
Dichagyris musiva (Hübner, 1803)
Dichagyris candelisequa (Denis & Schiffermüller, 1775)
Dichagyris flavina (Herrich-Schäffer, 1852)
Dichagyris forcipula (Denis & Schiffermüller, 1775)
Dichagyris melanura (Kollar, 1846)
Dichagyris nigrescens (Hofner, 1888)
Dichagyris renigera (Hübner, 1808)
Dichagyris signifera (Denis & Schiffermüller, 1775)
Dichonia aeruginea (Hübner, 1808)
Dichonia convergens (Denis & Schiffermüller, 1775)
Dicycla oo (Linnaeus, 1758)
Diloba caeruleocephala (Linnaeus, 1758)
Dioszeghyana schmidti (Dioszeghy, 1935)
Divaena haywardi (Tams, 1926)
Dryobota labecula (Esper, 1788)
Dryobotodes tenebrosa (Esper, 1789)
Dryobotodes carbonis Wagner, 1931
Dryobotodes eremita (Fabricius, 1775)
Dryobotodes monochroma (Esper, 1790)
Dryobotodes servadeii Parenzan, 1982
Dypterygia scabriuscula (Linnaeus, 1758)
Egira anatolica (M. Hering, 1933)
Egira conspicillaris (Linnaeus, 1758)
Egira tibori Hreblay, 1994
Elaphria venustula (Hübner, 1790)
Enargia abluta (Hübner, 1808)
Enargia paleacea (Esper, 1788)
Enterpia laudeti (Boisduval, 1840)
Epilecta linogrisea (Denis & Schiffermüller, 1775)
Epimecia ustula (Freyer, 1835)
Epipsilia cervantes (Reisser, 1935)
Epipsilia grisescens (Fabricius, 1794)
Episema glaucina (Esper, 1789)
Episema korsakovi (Christoph, 1885)
Episema lederi Christoph, 1885
Episema tersa (Denis & Schiffermüller, 1775)
Eremobia ochroleuca (Denis & Schiffermüller, 1775)
Eucarta amethystina (Hübner, 1803)
Eucarta virgo (Treitschke, 1835)
Euchalcia consona (Fabricius, 1787)
Euchalcia modestoides Poole, 1989
Euchalcia variabilis (Piller, 1783)
Eugnorisma depuncta (Linnaeus, 1761)
Eugnorisma pontica (Staudinger, 1892)
Eugraphe sigma (Denis & Schiffermüller, 1775)
Euplexia lucipara (Linnaeus, 1758)
Eupsilia transversa (Hufnagel, 1766)
Eurois occulta (Linnaeus, 1758)
Euxoa aquilina (Denis & Schiffermüller, 1775)
Euxoa birivia (Denis & Schiffermüller, 1775)
Euxoa conspicua (Hübner, 1824)
Euxoa cos (Hübner, 1824)
Euxoa decora (Denis & Schiffermüller, 1775)
Euxoa diaphora Boursin, 1928
Euxoa distinguenda (Lederer, 1857)
Euxoa eruta (Hübner, 1817)
Euxoa glabella Wagner, 1930
Euxoa hastifera (Donzel, 1847)
Euxoa nigricans (Linnaeus, 1761)
Euxoa nigrofusca (Esper, 1788)
Euxoa obelisca (Denis & Schiffermüller, 1775)
Euxoa pareruta Fibiger, Gyulai, Zilli, Yela & Ronkay, 2010
Euxoa segnilis (Duponchel, 1837)
Euxoa temera (Hübner, 1808)
Euxoa vitta (Esper, 1789)
Globia algae (Esper, 1789)
Globia sparganii (Esper, 1790)
Gortyna borelii Pierret, 1837
Gortyna flavago (Denis & Schiffermüller, 1775)
Gortyna moesiaca Herrich-Schäffer, 1849
Griposia aprilina (Linnaeus, 1758)
Griposia pinkeri Kobes, 1973
Hada plebeja (Linnaeus, 1761)
Hadena irregularis (Hufnagel, 1766)
Hadena perplexa (Denis & Schiffermüller, 1775)
Hadena silenes (Hübner, 1822)
Hadena syriaca (Osthelder, 1933)
Hadena adriana (Schawerda, 1921)
Hadena albimacula (Borkhausen, 1792)
Hadena caesia (Denis & Schiffermüller, 1775)
Hadena capsincola (Denis & Schiffermüller, 1775)
Hadena clara (Staudinger, 1901)
Hadena compta (Denis & Schiffermüller, 1775)
Hadena confusa (Hufnagel, 1766)
Hadena drenowskii (Rebel, 1930)
Hadena filograna (Esper, 1788)
Hadena magnolii (Boisduval, 1829)
Hadena vulcanica (Turati, 1907)
Hadena wehrlii (Draudt, 1934)
Hadena tephroleuca (Boisduval, 1833)
Haemerosia renalis (Hübner, 1813)
Haemerosia vassilininei A. Bang-Haas, 1912
Hecatera bicolorata (Hufnagel, 1766)
Hecatera cappa (Hübner, 1809)
Hecatera dysodea (Denis & Schiffermüller, 1775)
Helicoverpa armigera (Hübner, 1808)
Heliothis adaucta Butler, 1878
Heliothis incarnata Freyer, 1838
Heliothis maritima Graslin, 1855
Heliothis nubigera Herrich-Schäffer, 1851
Heliothis peltigera (Denis & Schiffermüller, 1775)
Heliothis viriplaca (Hufnagel, 1766)
Helivictoria victorina (Sodoffsky, 1849)
Helotropha leucostigma (Hübner, 1808)
Hoplodrina ambigua (Denis & Schiffermüller, 1775)
Hoplodrina blanda (Denis & Schiffermüller, 1775)
Hoplodrina octogenaria (Goeze, 1781)
Hoplodrina respersa (Denis & Schiffermüller, 1775)
Hoplodrina superstes (Ochsenheimer, 1816)
Hydraecia micacea (Esper, 1789)
Hydraecia petasitis Doubleday, 1847
Hydraecia ultima Holst, 1965
Hyppa rectilinea (Esper, 1788)
Ipimorpha retusa (Linnaeus, 1761)
Ipimorpha subtusa (Denis & Schiffermüller, 1775)
Janthinea friwaldskii (Duponchel, 1835)
Jodia croceago (Denis & Schiffermüller, 1775)
Lacanobia contigua (Denis & Schiffermüller, 1775)
Lacanobia suasa (Denis & Schiffermüller, 1775)
Lacanobia thalassina (Hufnagel, 1766)
Lacanobia blenna (Hübner, 1824)
Lacanobia oleracea (Linnaeus, 1758)
Lacanobia praedita (Hübner, 1813)
Lacanobia splendens (Hübner, 1808)
Lacanobia w-latinum (Hufnagel, 1766)
Lamprosticta culta (Denis & Schiffermüller, 1775)
Lamprotes c-aureum (Knoch, 1781)
Lasionycta imbecilla (Fabricius, 1794)
Lasionycta proxima (Hübner, 1809)
Lateroligia ophiogramma (Esper, 1794)
Lenisa geminipuncta (Haworth, 1809)
Leucania loreyi (Duponchel, 1827)
Leucania comma (Linnaeus, 1761)
Leucania herrichi Herrich-Schäffer, 1849
Leucania obsoleta (Hübner, 1803)
Leucania punctosa (Treitschke, 1825)
Leucania putrescens (Hübner, 1824)
Lithophane furcifera (Hufnagel, 1766)
Lithophane ledereri (Staudinger, 1892)
Lithophane merckii (Rambur, 1832)
Lithophane ornitopus (Hufnagel, 1766)
Lithophane semibrunnea (Haworth, 1809)
Lithophane socia (Hufnagel, 1766)
Lithophane lapidea (Hübner, 1808)
Luperina dumerilii (Duponchel, 1826)
Luperina rubella (Duponchel, 1835)
Luperina testacea (Denis & Schiffermüller, 1775)
Lycophotia molothina (Esper, 1789)
Lycophotia porphyrea (Denis & Schiffermüller, 1775)
Macdunnoughia confusa (Stephens, 1850)
Mamestra brassicae (Linnaeus, 1758)
Megalodes eximia (Freyer, 1845)
Meganephria bimaculosa (Linnaeus, 1767)
Melanchra persicariae (Linnaeus, 1761)
Mesapamea secalella Remm, 1983
Mesapamea secalis (Linnaeus, 1758)
Mesogona acetosellae (Denis & Schiffermüller, 1775)
Mesogona oxalina (Hübner, 1803)
Mesoligia furuncula (Denis & Schiffermüller, 1775)
Mniotype adusta (Esper, 1790)
Mniotype satura (Denis & Schiffermüller, 1775)
Mniotype solieri (Boisduval, 1829)
Moma alpium (Osbeck, 1778)
Mormo maura (Linnaeus, 1758)
Mycteroplus puniceago (Boisduval, 1840)
Mythimna riparia (Rambur, 1829)
Mythimna albipuncta (Denis & Schiffermüller, 1775)
Mythimna congrua (Hübner, 1817)
Mythimna ferrago (Fabricius, 1787)
Mythimna l-album (Linnaeus, 1767)
Mythimna conigera (Denis & Schiffermüller, 1775)
Mythimna impura (Hübner, 1808)
Mythimna pallens (Linnaeus, 1758)
Mythimna pudorina (Denis & Schiffermüller, 1775)
Mythimna straminea (Treitschke, 1825)
Mythimna turca (Linnaeus, 1761)
Mythimna vitellina (Hübner, 1808)
Mythimna unipuncta (Haworth, 1809)
Mythimna alopecuri (Boisduval, 1840)
Mythimna andereggii (Boisduval, 1840)
Mythimna sicula (Treitschke, 1835)
Naenia typica (Linnaeus, 1758)
Noctua comes Hübner, 1813
Noctua fimbriata (Schreber, 1759)
Noctua interjecta Hübner, 1803
Noctua interposita (Hübner, 1790)
Noctua janthina Denis & Schiffermüller, 1775
Noctua orbona (Hufnagel, 1766)
Noctua pronuba (Linnaeus, 1758)
Noctua tertia Mentzer & al., 1991
Noctua tirrenica Biebinger, Speidel & Hanigk, 1983
Nonagria typhae (Thunberg, 1784)
Nyctobrya amasina Draudt, 1931
Nyctobrya muralis (Forster, 1771)
Ochropleura leucogaster (Freyer, 1831)
Ochropleura plecta (Linnaeus, 1761)
Oligia latruncula (Denis & Schiffermüller, 1775)
Oligia strigilis (Linnaeus, 1758)
Oligia versicolor (Borkhausen, 1792)
Olivenebula subsericata (Herrich-Schäffer, 1861)
Omphalophana anatolica (Lederer, 1857)
Omphalophana antirrhinii (Hübner, 1803)
Oncocnemis confusa (Freyer, 1839)
Oncocnemis michaelorum Beshkov, 1997
Opigena polygona (Denis & Schiffermüller, 1775)
Orbona fragariae Vieweg, 1790
Oria musculosa (Hübner, 1808)
Orthosia gracilis (Denis & Schiffermüller, 1775)
Orthosia opima (Hübner, 1809)
Orthosia cerasi (Fabricius, 1775)
Orthosia cruda (Denis & Schiffermüller, 1775)
Orthosia miniosa (Denis & Schiffermüller, 1775)
Orthosia populeti (Fabricius, 1775)
Orthosia incerta (Hufnagel, 1766)
Orthosia gothica (Linnaeus, 1758)
Oxicesta geographica (Fabricius, 1787)
Oxytripia orbiculosa (Esper, 1799)
Pabulatrix pabulatricula (Brahm, 1791)
Pachetra sagittigera (Hufnagel, 1766)
Panchrysia aurea (Hübner, 1803)
Panemeria tenebrata (Scopoli, 1763)
Panemeria tenebromorpha Rakosy, Hentscholek & Huber, 1996
Panolis flammea (Denis & Schiffermüller, 1775)
Panthea coenobita (Esper, 1785)
Papestra biren (Goeze, 1781)
Parastichtis suspecta (Hübner, 1817)
Peridroma saucia (Hübner, 1808)
Perigrapha i-cinctum (Denis & Schiffermüller, 1775)
Perigrapha rorida Frivaldszky, 1835
Periphanes delphinii (Linnaeus, 1758)
Philareta treitschkei (Frivaldszky, 1835)
Phlogophora meticulosa (Linnaeus, 1758)
Phlogophora scita (Hübner, 1790)
Photedes captiuncula (Treitschke, 1825)
Photedes fluxa (Hübner, 1809)
Photedes minima (Haworth, 1809)
Photedes morrisii (Dale, 1837)
Plusia festucae (Linnaeus, 1758)
Plusia putnami (Grote, 1873)
Polia bombycina (Hufnagel, 1766)
Polia hepatica (Clerck, 1759)
Polia nebulosa (Hufnagel, 1766)
Polia serratilinea Ochsenheimer, 1816
Polychrysia moneta (Fabricius, 1787)
Polymixis leuconota (Frivaldszky, 1841)
Polymixis polymita (Linnaeus, 1761)
Polymixis rufocincta (Geyer, 1828)
Polymixis serpentina (Treitschke, 1825)
Polymixis xanthomista (Hübner, 1819)
Polyphaenis sericata (Esper, 1787)
Praestilbia armeniaca Staudinger, 1892
Protoschinia scutosa (Denis & Schiffermüller, 1775)
Pseudeustrotia candidula (Denis & Schiffermüller, 1775)
Pseudozarba bipartita (Herrich-Schäffer, 1850)
Pyrrhia purpura (Hübner, 1817)
Pyrrhia umbra (Hufnagel, 1766)
Rhizedra lutosa (Hübner, 1803)
Rhyacia arenacea (Hampson, 1907)
Rhyacia lucipeta (Denis & Schiffermüller, 1775)
Rhyacia simulans (Hufnagel, 1766)
Rileyiana fovea (Treitschke, 1825)
Schinia cardui (Hübner, 1790)
Schinia cognata (Freyer, 1833)
Scotochrosta pulla (Denis & Schiffermüller, 1775)
Sedina buettneri (E. Hering, 1858)
Senta flammea (Curtis, 1828)
Sesamia cretica Lederer, 1857
Sesamia nonagrioides Lefebvre, 1827
Sideridis rivularis (Fabricius, 1775)
Sideridis implexa (Hübner, 1809)
Sideridis reticulata (Goeze, 1781)
Sideridis lampra (Schawerda, 1913)
Sideridis turbida (Esper, 1790)
Simyra albovenosa (Goeze, 1781)
Simyra dentinosa Freyer, 1838
Simyra nervosa (Denis & Schiffermüller, 1775)
Spaelotis ravida (Denis & Schiffermüller, 1775)
Spaelotis senna (Freyer, 1829)
Spodoptera exigua (Hübner, 1808)
Standfussiana lucernea (Linnaeus, 1758)
Subacronicta megacephala (Denis & Schiffermüller, 1775)
Syngrapha interrogationis (Linnaeus, 1758)
Syngrapha rilaecacuminum Varga & L. Ronkay, 1992
Teinoptera lunaki (Boursin, 1940)
Teinoptera olivina (Herrich-Schäffer, 1852)
Thalpophila matura (Hufnagel, 1766)
Tholera cespitis (Denis & Schiffermüller, 1775)
Tholera decimalis (Poda, 1761)
Thysanoplusia daubei (Boisduval, 1840)
Thysanoplusia orichalcea (Fabricius, 1775)
Tiliacea aurago (Denis & Schiffermüller, 1775)
Tiliacea citrago (Linnaeus, 1758)
Tiliacea cypreago (Hampson, 1906)
Tiliacea sulphurago (Denis & Schiffermüller, 1775)
Trachea atriplicis (Linnaeus, 1758)
Trichoplusia ni (Hübner, 1803)
Trigonophora flammea (Esper, 1785)
Tyta luctuosa (Denis & Schiffermüller, 1775)
Ulochlaena hirta (Hübner, 1813)
Valeria oleagina (Denis & Schiffermüller, 1775)
Valerietta hreblayi Beshkov, 2006
Valerietta niphopasta (Hampson, 1906)
Xanthia gilvago (Denis & Schiffermüller, 1775)
Xanthia icteritia (Hufnagel, 1766)
Xanthia ocellaris (Borkhausen, 1792)
Xanthia castanea Osthelder, 1933
Xanthia togata (Esper, 1788)
Xestia ashworthii (Doubleday, 1855)
Xestia c-nigrum (Linnaeus, 1758)
Xestia ditrapezium (Denis & Schiffermüller, 1775)
Xestia triangulum (Hufnagel, 1766)
Xestia speciosa (Hübner, 1813)
Xestia baja (Denis & Schiffermüller, 1775)
Xestia castanea (Esper, 1798)
Xestia cohaesa (Herrich-Schäffer, 1849)
Xestia collina (Boisduval, 1840)
Xestia ochreago (Hübner, 1809)
Xestia stigmatica (Hübner, 1813)
Xestia xanthographa (Denis & Schiffermüller, 1775)
Xylena solidaginis (Hübner, 1803)
Xylena exsoleta (Linnaeus, 1758)
Xylena lunifera Warren, 1910
Xylena vetusta (Hübner, 1813)
Xylocampa mustapha (Oberthur, 1920)

Nolidae
Bena bicolorana (Fuessly, 1775)
Earias clorana (Linnaeus, 1761)
Earias vernana (Fabricius, 1787)
Meganola albula (Denis & Schiffermüller, 1775)
Meganola gigantula (Staudinger, 1879)
Meganola impura (Mann, 1862)
Meganola kolbi (Daniel, 1935)
Meganola strigula (Denis & Schiffermüller, 1775)
Meganola togatulalis (Hübner, 1796)
Nola aerugula (Hübner, 1793)
Nola chlamitulalis (Hübner, 1813)
Nola cicatricalis (Treitschke, 1835)
Nola confusalis (Herrich-Schäffer, 1847)
Nola cristatula (Hübner, 1793)
Nola cucullatella (Linnaeus, 1758)
Nola harouni (Wiltshire, 1951)
Nola ronkayorum Beshkov, 2006
Nola squalida Staudinger, 1871
Nola subchlamydula Staudinger, 1871
Nycteola asiatica (Krulikovsky, 1904)
Nycteola columbana (Turner, 1925)
Nycteola revayana (Scopoli, 1772)
Nycteola siculana (Fuchs, 1899)
Pseudoips prasinana (Linnaeus, 1758)

Notodontidae
Cerura erminea (Esper, 1783)
Cerura vinula (Linnaeus, 1758)
Clostera anachoreta (Denis & Schiffermüller, 1775)
Clostera anastomosis (Linnaeus, 1758)
Clostera curtula (Linnaeus, 1758)
Clostera pigra (Hufnagel, 1766)
Dicranura ulmi (Denis & Schiffermüller, 1775)
Drymonia dodonaea (Denis & Schiffermüller, 1775)
Drymonia obliterata (Esper, 1785)
Drymonia querna (Denis & Schiffermüller, 1775)
Drymonia ruficornis (Hufnagel, 1766)
Drymonia velitaris (Hufnagel, 1766)
Furcula bicuspis (Borkhausen, 1790)
Furcula bifida (Brahm, 1787)
Furcula furcula (Clerck, 1759)
Gluphisia crenata (Esper, 1785)
Harpyia milhauseri (Fabricius, 1775)
Notodonta dromedarius (Linnaeus, 1767)
Notodonta tritophus (Denis & Schiffermüller, 1775)
Notodonta ziczac (Linnaeus, 1758)
Paradrymonia vittata (Staudinger, 1892)
Peridea anceps (Goeze, 1781)
Peridea korbi (Rebel, 1918)
Phalera bucephala (Linnaeus, 1758)
Phalera bucephaloides (Ochsenheimer, 1810)
Pheosia gnoma (Fabricius, 1776)
Pheosia tremula (Clerck, 1759)
Pterostoma palpina (Clerck, 1759)
Ptilodon capucina (Linnaeus, 1758)
Ptilodon cucullina (Denis & Schiffermüller, 1775)
Ptilophora plumigera (Denis & Schiffermüller, 1775)
Rhegmatophila alpina (Bellier, 1881)
Spatalia argentina (Denis & Schiffermüller, 1775)
Stauropus fagi (Linnaeus, 1758)
Thaumetopoea pityocampa (Denis & Schiffermüller, 1775)
Thaumetopoea processionea (Linnaeus, 1758)
Thaumetopoea solitaria (Freyer, 1838)

Oecophoridae
Alabonia staintoniella (Zeller, 1850)
Batia lunaris (Haworth, 1828)
Borkhausenia minutella (Linnaeus, 1758)
Crassa tinctella (Hübner, 1796)
Crossotocera wagnerella Zerny, 1930
Dasycera oliviella (Fabricius, 1794)
Denisia augustella (Hübner, 1796)
Denisia stipella (Linnaeus, 1758)
Endrosis sarcitrella (Linnaeus, 1758)
Epicallima formosella (Denis & Schiffermüller, 1775)
Epicallima icterinella (Mann, 1867)
Fabiola pokornyi (Nickerl, 1864)
Harpella forficella (Scopoli, 1763)
Hofmannophila pseudospretella (Stainton, 1849)
Holoscolia huebneri Kocak, 1980
Minetia crinitus (Fabricius, 1798)
Minetia labiosella (Hübner, 1810)
Oecophora bractella (Linnaeus, 1758)
Pleurota aristella (Linnaeus, 1767)
Pleurota cumaniella Rebel, 1907
Pleurota metricella (Zeller, 1847)
Pleurota planella (Staudinger, 1859)
Pleurota proteella Staudinger, 1880
Pleurota pungitiella Herrich-Schäffer, 1854
Pleurota pyropella (Denis & Schiffermüller, 1775)
Schiffermuelleria schaefferella (Linnaeus, 1758)

Opostegidae
Opostega salaciella (Treitschke, 1833)
Opostega spatulella Herrich-Schäffer, 1855
Pseudopostega crepusculella (Zeller, 1839)

Peleopodidae
Carcina quercana (Fabricius, 1775)

Plutellidae
Eidophasia messingiella (Fischer von Röslerstamm, 1840)
Eidophasia syenitella Herrich-Schäffer, 1854
Plutella xylostella (Linnaeus, 1758)
Rhigognostis wolfschlaegeri (Rebel, 1940)

Praydidae
Prays fraxinella (Bjerkander, 1784)

Prodoxidae
Lampronia morosa Zeller, 1852
Lampronia rupella (Denis & Schiffermüller, 1775)

Psychidae
Acanthopsyche ecksteini (Lederer, 1855)
Anaproutia comitella (Bruand, 1853)
Apterona crenulella (Bruand, 1853)
Apterona helicoidella (Vallot, 1827)
Bacotia claustrella (Bruand, 1845)
Bijugis bombycella (Denis & Schiffermüller, 1775)
Bijugis pectinella (Denis & Schiffermüller, 1775)
Canephora hirsuta (Poda, 1761)
Dahlica triquetrella (Hübner, 1813)
Diplodoma laichartingella Goeze, 1783
Eochorica balcanica (Rebel, 1919)
Epichnopterix kovacsi Sieder, 1955
Epichnopterix plumella (Denis & Schiffermüller, 1775)
Eumasia parietariella (Heydenreich, 1851)
Heliopsychidea graecella (Milliere, 1866)
Loebelia crassicornis (Staudinger, 1870)
Megalophanes viciella (Denis & Schiffermüller, 1775)
Oiketicoides lutea (Staudinger, 1870)
Oiketicoides senex (Staudinger, 1871)
Pachythelia villosella (Ochsenheimer, 1810)
Proutia betulina (Zeller, 1839)
Psyche casta (Pallas, 1767)
Psyche crassiorella Bruand, 1851
Psychidea balcanica (Wehrli, 1933)
Psychidea nudella (Ochsenheimer, 1810)
Ptilocephala albida (Esper, 1786)
Ptilocephala muscella (Denis & Schiffermüller, 1775)
Ptilocephala plumifera (Ochsenheimer, 1810)
Rebelia herrichiella Strand, 1912
Rebelia perlucidella (Bruand, 1853)
Rebelia sapho (Milliere, 1864)
Reisseronia nigrociliella (Rebel, 1934)
Reisseronia pusilella (Rebel, 1941)
Sterrhopterix fusca (Haworth, 1809)
Taleporia tubulosa (Retzius, 1783)
Typhonia ciliaris (Ochsenheimer, 1810)

Pterolonchidae
Pterolonche pulverulenta Zeller, 1847
Pterolonche albescens Zeller, 1847
Pterolonche inspersa Staudinger, 1859

Pterophoridae
Adaina microdactyla (Hübner, 1813)
Agdistis adactyla (Hübner, 1819)
Agdistis frankeniae (Zeller, 1847)
Agdistis heydeni (Zeller, 1852)
Agdistis satanas Milliere, 1875
Agdistis tamaricis (Zeller, 1847)
Amblyptilia acanthadactyla (Hübner, 1813)
Amblyptilia punctidactyla (Haworth, 1811)
Buszkoiana capnodactylus (Zeller, 1841)
Calyciphora albodactylus (Fabricius, 1794)
Calyciphora homoiodactyla (Kasy, 1960)
Calyciphora nephelodactyla (Eversmann, 1844)
Calyciphora xanthodactyla (Treitschke, 1833)
Capperia britanniodactylus (Gregson, 1867)
Capperia celeusi (Frey, 1886)
Capperia fusca (O. Hofmann, 1898)
Capperia maratonica Adamczewski, 1951
Capperia trichodactyla (Denis & Schiffermüller, 1775)
Cnaemidophorus rhododactyla (Denis & Schiffermüller, 1775)
Crombrugghia distans (Zeller, 1847)
Crombrugghia laetus (Zeller, 1847)
Crombrugghia tristis (Zeller, 1841)
Emmelina argoteles (Meyrick, 1922)
Emmelina monodactyla (Linnaeus, 1758)
Geina didactyla (Linnaeus, 1758)
Gillmeria miantodactylus (Zeller, 1841)
Gillmeria ochrodactyla (Denis & Schiffermüller, 1775)
Gillmeria pallidactyla (Haworth, 1811)
Hellinsia carphodactyla (Hübner, 1813)
Hellinsia didactylites (Strom, 1783)
Hellinsia inulae (Zeller, 1852)
Hellinsia lienigianus (Zeller, 1852)
Hellinsia osteodactylus (Zeller, 1841)
Hellinsia tephradactyla (Hübner, 1813)
Merrifieldia baliodactylus (Zeller, 1841)
Merrifieldia leucodactyla (Denis & Schiffermüller, 1775)
Merrifieldia malacodactylus (Zeller, 1847)
Merrifieldia tridactyla (Linnaeus, 1758)
Oidaematophorus lithodactyla (Treitschke, 1833)
Oxyptilus chrysodactyla (Denis & Schiffermüller, 1775)
Oxyptilus ericetorum (Stainton, 1851)
Oxyptilus parvidactyla (Haworth, 1811)
Oxyptilus pilosellae (Zeller, 1841)
Paraplatyptilia metzneri (Zeller, 1841)
Platyptilia calodactyla (Denis & Schiffermüller, 1775)
Platyptilia farfarellus Zeller, 1867
Platyptilia gonodactyla (Denis & Schiffermüller, 1775)
Platyptilia nemoralis Zeller, 1841
Platyptilia tesseradactyla (Linnaeus, 1761)
Procapperia linariae (Chretien, 1922)
Pselnophorus heterodactyla (Muller, 1764)
Pterophorus ischnodactyla (Treitschke, 1835)
Pterophorus pentadactyla (Linnaeus, 1758)
Stangeia siceliota (Zeller, 1847)
Stenoptilia aridus (Zeller, 1847)
Stenoptilia bipunctidactyla (Scopoli, 1763)
Stenoptilia coprodactylus (Stainton, 1851)
Stenoptilia graphodactyla (Treitschke, 1833)
Stenoptilia gratiolae Gibeaux & Nel, 1990
Stenoptilia mannii (Zeller, 1852)
Stenoptilia pelidnodactyla (Stein, 1837)
Stenoptilia pneumonanthes (Buttner, 1880)
Stenoptilia pterodactyla (Linnaeus, 1761)
Stenoptilia stigmatodactylus (Zeller, 1852)
Stenoptilia zophodactylus (Duponchel, 1840)
Stenoptilodes taprobanes (Felder & Rogenhofer, 1875)
Wheeleria ivae (Kasy, 1960)
Wheeleria obsoletus (Zeller, 1841)

Pyralidae
Achroia grisella (Fabricius, 1794)
Acrobasis centunculella (Mann, 1859)
Acrobasis dulcella (Zeller, 1848)
Acrobasis glaucella Staudinger, 1859
Acrobasis obtusella (Hübner, 1796)
Acrobasis repandana (Fabricius, 1798)
Acrobasis sodalella Zeller, 1848
Acrobasis suavella (Zincken, 1818)
Acrobasis tumidana (Denis & Schiffermüller, 1775)
Aglossa caprealis (Hübner, 1809)
Aglossa pinguinalis (Linnaeus, 1758)
Aglossa signicostalis Staudinger, 1871
Ancylosis cinnamomella (Duponchel, 1836)
Ancylosis deserticola (Staudinger, 1870)
Ancylosis hellenica (Staudinger, 1871)
Ancylosis maculifera Staudinger, 1870
Ancylosis oblitella (Zeller, 1848)
Ancylosis roscidella (Eversmann, 1844)
Ancylosis sareptalla (Herrich-Schäffer, 1861)
Aphomia sociella (Linnaeus, 1758)
Aphomia zelleri de Joannis, 1932
Apomyelois ceratoniae (Zeller, 1839)
Asalebria florella (Mann, 1862)
Asarta aethiopella (Duponchel, 1837)
Assara terebrella (Zincken, 1818)
Bostra obsoletalis (Mann, 1884)
Bradyrrhoa confiniella Zeller, 1848
Bradyrrhoa gilveolella (Treitschke, 1832)
Cadra cautella (Walker, 1863)
Cadra figulilella (Gregson, 1871)
Cadra furcatella (Herrich-Schäffer, 1849)
Catastia acraspedella Staudinger, 1879
Catastia marginea (Denis & Schiffermüller, 1775)
Corcyra cephalonica (Stainton, 1866)
Cryptoblabes bistriga (Haworth, 1811)
Delplanqueia dilutella (Denis & Schiffermüller, 1775)
Denticera divisella (Duponchel, 1842)
Dioryctria abietella (Denis & Schiffermüller, 1775)
Dioryctria sylvestrella (Ratzeburg, 1840)
Eccopisa effractella Zeller, 1848
Elegia fallax (Staudinger, 1881)
Elegia similella (Zincken, 1818)
Ematheudes punctella (Treitschke, 1833)
Endotricha flammealis (Denis & Schiffermüller, 1775)
Ephestia disparella Hampson, 1901
Ephestia elutella (Hübner, 1796)
Ephestia kuehniella Zeller, 1879
Ephestia unicolorella Staudinger, 1881
Ephestia welseriella (Zeller, 1848)
Epischnia prodromella (Hübner, 1799)
Episcythrastis tabidella (Mann, 1864)
Episcythrastis tetricella (Denis & Schiffermüller, 1775)
Etiella zinckenella (Treitschke, 1832)
Eurhodope cirrigerella (Zincken, 1818)
Eurhodope monogrammos (Zeller, 1867)
Eurhodope rosella (Scopoli, 1763)
Euzophera bigella (Zeller, 1848)
Euzophera cinerosella (Zeller, 1839)
Euzophera fuliginosella (Heinemann, 1865)
Euzophera nessebarella Soffner, 1962
Euzophera pinguis (Haworth, 1811)
Euzophera pulchella Ragonot, 1887
Euzopherodes charlottae (Rebel, 1914)
Euzopherodes lutisignella (Mann, 1869)
Euzopherodes vapidella (Mann, 1857)
Galleria mellonella (Linnaeus, 1758)
Gymnancyla canella (Denis & Schiffermüller, 1775)
Gymnancyla hornigii (Lederer, 1852)
Homoeosoma calcella Ragonot, 1887
Homoeosoma inustella Ragonot, 1884
Homoeosoma nebulella (Denis & Schiffermüller, 1775)
Homoeosoma nimbella (Duponchel, 1837)
Homoeosoma sinuella (Fabricius, 1794)
Hypochalcia ahenella (Denis & Schiffermüller, 1775)
Hypochalcia balcanica Ragonot, 1887
Hypochalcia dignella (Hübner, 1796)
Hypochalcia propinquella (Guenee, 1845)
Hypotia massilialis (Duponchel, 1832)
Hypsopygia costalis (Fabricius, 1775)
Hypsopygia fulvocilialis (Duponchel, 1834)
Hypsopygia glaucinalis (Linnaeus, 1758)
Hypsopygia rubidalis (Denis & Schiffermüller, 1775)
Hypsotropa limbella Zeller, 1848
Insalebria serraticornella (Zeller, 1839)
Isauria dilucidella (Duponchel, 1836)
Khorassania compositella (Treitschke, 1835)
Lamoria anella (Denis & Schiffermüller, 1775)
Loryma egregialis (Herrich-Schäffer, 1838)
Matilella fusca (Haworth, 1811)
Megasis rippertella (Zeller, 1839)
Metallosticha argyrogrammos (Zeller, 1847)
Moitrelia obductella (Zeller, 1839)
Myelois circumvoluta (Fourcroy, 1785)
Myelois multiflorella Ragonot, 1887
Nyctegretis ruminella La Harpe, 1860
Oncocera semirubella (Scopoli, 1763)
Oxybia transversella (Duponchel, 1836)
Pempelia alpigenella (Duponchel, 1836)
Pempelia palumbella (Denis & Schiffermüller, 1775)
Pempeliella alibotuschella (Drenowski, 1932)
Pempeliella ornatella (Denis & Schiffermüller, 1775)
Pempeliella sororiella Zeller, 1839
Phycita coronatella (Guenee, 1845)
Phycita meliella (Mann, 1864)
Phycita metzneri (Zeller, 1846)
Phycita poteriella (Zeller, 1846)
Phycita roborella (Denis & Schiffermüller, 1775)
Phycitodes albatella (Ragonot, 1887)
Phycitodes binaevella (Hübner, 1813)
Phycitodes lacteella (Rothschild, 1915)
Phycitodes maritima (Tengstrom, 1848)
Phycitodes saxicola (Vaughan, 1870)
Plodia interpunctella (Hübner, 1813)
Psorosa dahliella (Treitschke, 1832)
Pterothrixidia rufella (Duponchel, 1836)
Pyralis farinalis (Linnaeus, 1758)
Pyralis regalis Denis & Schiffermüller, 1775
Raphimetopus ablutella (Zeller, 1839)
Rhodophaea formosa (Haworth, 1811)
Sciota insignella (Mann, 1862)
Sciota rhenella (Zincken, 1818)
Selagia argyrella (Denis & Schiffermüller, 1775)
Selagia spadicella (Hübner, 1796)
Selagia subochrella (Herrich-Schäffer, 1849)
Stemmatophora brunnealis (Treitschke, 1829)
Stemmatophora combustalis (Fischer v. Röslerstamm, 1842)
Stemmatophora honestalis (Treitschke, 1829)
Synaphe antennalis (Fabricius, 1794)
Synaphe moldavica (Esper, 1794)
Synaphe punctalis (Fabricius, 1775)

Saturniidae
Aglia tau (Linnaeus, 1758)
Saturnia pavoniella (Scopoli, 1763)
Saturnia spini (Denis & Schiffermüller, 1775)
Saturnia caecigena Kupido, 1825
Saturnia pyri (Denis & Schiffermüller, 1775)

Scythrididae
Episcythris triangulella (Ragonot, 1874)
Parascythris muelleri (Mann, 1871)
Scythris aerariella (Herrich-Schäffer, 1855)
Scythris anomaloptera (Staudinger, 1880)
Scythris clavella (Zeller, 1855)
Scythris crassiuscula (Herrich-Schäffer, 1855)
Scythris crypta Hannemann, 1961
Scythris cuspidella (Denis & Schiffermüller, 1775)
Scythris fallacella (Schlager, 1847)
Scythris flabella (Mann, 1861)
Scythris flavilaterella (Fuchs, 1886)
Scythris gravatella (Zeller, 1847)
Scythris hungaricella Rebel, 1917
Scythris inertella (Zeller, 1855)
Scythris lafauryi Passerin d'Entreves, 1986
Scythris laminella (Denis & Schiffermüller, 1775)
Scythris limbella (Fabricius, 1775)
Scythris moldavicella Caradja, 1905
Scythris obscurella (Scopoli, 1763)
Scythris picaepennis (Haworth, 1828)
Scythris platypyga (Staudinger, 1880)
Scythris potentillella (Zeller, 1847)
Scythris productella (Zeller, 1839)
Scythris pudorinella (Moschler, 1866)
Scythris punctivittella (O. Costa, 1836)
Scythris saxella Bengtsson, 1991
Scythris similis Hannemann, 1961
Scythris subaerariella (Stainton, 1867)
Scythris subschleichiella Hannemann, 1961
Scythris tabidella (Herrich-Schäffer, 1855)
Scythris tergestinella (Zeller, 1855)
Scythris tributella (Zeller, 1847)
Scythris vittella (O. Costa, 1834)

Sesiidae
Bembecia albanensis (Rebel, 1918)
Bembecia ichneumoniformis (Denis & Schiffermüller, 1775)
Bembecia megillaeformis (Hübner, 1813)
Bembecia pavicevici Tosevski, 1989
Bembecia puella Z. Lastuvka, 1989
Bembecia sanguinolenta (Lederer, 1853)
Bembecia scopigera (Scopoli, 1763)
Chamaesphecia albiventris (Lederer, 1853)
Chamaesphecia alysoniformis (Herrich-Schäffer, 1846)
Chamaesphecia annellata (Zeller, 1847)
Chamaesphecia astatiformis (Herrich-Schäffer, 1846)
Chamaesphecia bibioniformis (Esper, 1800)
Chamaesphecia chalciformis (Esper, 1804)
Chamaesphecia crassicornis Bartel, 1912
Chamaesphecia doleriformis (Herrich-Schäffer, 1846)
Chamaesphecia dumonti Le Cerf, 1922
Chamaesphecia empiformis (Esper, 1783)
Chamaesphecia euceraeformis (Ochsenheimer, 1816)
Chamaesphecia leucopsiformis (Esper, 1800)
Chamaesphecia masariformis (Ochsenheimer, 1808)
Chamaesphecia nigrifrons (Le Cerf, 1911)
Chamaesphecia oxybeliformis (Herrich-Schäffer, 1846)
Chamaesphecia proximata (Staudinger, 1891)
Chamaesphecia schmidtiiformis (Freyer, 1836)
Chamaesphecia tenthrediniformis (Denis & Schiffermüller, 1775)
Chamaesphecia thracica Z. Lastuvka, 1983
Dipchasphecia lanipes (Lederer, 1863)
Paranthrene diaphana Dalla Torre & Strand, 1925
Paranthrene insolitus Le Cerf, 1914
Paranthrene tabaniformis (Rottemburg, 1775)
Pennisetia hylaeiformis (Laspeyres, 1801)
Pyropteron leucomelaena (Zeller, 1847)
Pyropteron mannii (Lederer, 1853)
Pyropteron minianiformis (Freyer, 1843)
Pyropteron muscaeformis (Esper, 1783)
Pyropteron triannuliformis (Freyer, 1843)
Sesia apiformis (Clerck, 1759)
Sesia pimplaeformis Oberthur, 1872
Synanthedon andrenaeformis (Laspeyres, 1801)
Synanthedon cephiformis (Ochsenheimer, 1808)
Synanthedon conopiformis (Esper, 1782)
Synanthedon culiciformis (Linnaeus, 1758)
Synanthedon formicaeformis (Esper, 1783)
Synanthedon loranthi (Kralicek, 1966)
Synanthedon melliniformis (Laspeyres, 1801)
Synanthedon mesiaeformis (Herrich-Schäffer, 1846)
Synanthedon myopaeformis (Borkhausen, 1789)
Synanthedon scoliaeformis (Borkhausen, 1789)
Synanthedon spuleri (Fuchs, 1908)
Synanthedon stomoxiformis (Hübner, 1790)
Synanthedon tipuliformis (Clerck, 1759)
Synanthedon vespiformis (Linnaeus, 1761)
Tinthia brosiformis (Hübner, 1813)
Tinthia myrmosaeformis (Herrich-Schäffer, 1846)
Tinthia tineiformis (Esper, 1789)

Sphingidae
Acherontia atropos (Linnaeus, 1758)
Agrius convolvuli (Linnaeus, 1758)
Daphnis nerii (Linnaeus, 1758)
Deilephila elpenor (Linnaeus, 1758)
Deilephila porcellus (Linnaeus, 1758)
Dolbina elegans A. Bang-Haas, 1912
Hemaris croatica (Esper, 1800)
Hemaris fuciformis (Linnaeus, 1758)
Hemaris tityus (Linnaeus, 1758)
Hippotion celerio (Linnaeus, 1758)
Hyles euphorbiae (Linnaeus, 1758)
Hyles gallii (Rottemburg, 1775)
Hyles hippophaes (Esper, 1789)
Hyles livornica (Esper, 1780)
Hyles nicaea (de Prunner, 1798)
Hyles vespertilio (Esper, 1780)
Laothoe populi (Linnaeus, 1758)
Macroglossum stellatarum (Linnaeus, 1758)
Marumba quercus (Denis & Schiffermüller, 1775)
Mimas tiliae (Linnaeus, 1758)
Proserpinus proserpina (Pallas, 1772)
Rethera komarovi (Christoph, 1885)
Smerinthus ocellata (Linnaeus, 1758)
Sphingoneopsis gorgoniades (Hübner, 1819)
Sphinx ligustri Linnaeus, 1758
Sphinx pinastri Linnaeus, 1758
Theretra alecto (Linnaeus, 1758)

Thyrididae
Thyris fenestrella (Scopoli, 1763)

Tineidae
Ateliotum hungaricellum Zeller, 1839
Cephimallota angusticostella (Zeller, 1839)
Ceratuncus danubiella (Mann, 1866)
Elatobia fuliginosella (Lienig & Zeller, 1846)
Eudarcia balcanicum (Gaedike, 1988)
Eudarcia forsteri (Petersen, 1964)
Eudarcia granulatella (Zeller, 1852)
Eudarcia kasyi (Petersen, 1971)
Euplocamus anthracinalis (Scopoli, 1763)
Euplocamus ophisus (Cramer, 1779)
Haplotinea ditella (Pierce & Metcalfe, 1938)
Haplotinea insectella (Fabricius, 1794)
Hapsifera luridella Zeller, 1847
Infurcitinea albicomella (Stainton, 1851)
Infurcitinea finalis Gozmany, 1959
Infurcitinea kasyi Petersen, 1962
Infurcitinea rumelicella (Rebel, 1903)
Lichenotinea pustulatella (Zeller, 1852)
Monopis crocicapitella (Clemens, 1859)
Monopis imella (Hübner, 1813)
Monopis laevigella (Denis & Schiffermüller, 1775)
Monopis monachella (Hübner, 1796)
Monopis obviella (Denis & Schiffermüller, 1775)
Monopis weaverella (Scott, 1858)
Morophaga choragella (Denis & Schiffermüller, 1775)
Myrmecozela parnassiella (Rebel, 1915)
Nemapogon clematella (Fabricius, 1781)
Nemapogon cloacella (Haworth, 1828)
Nemapogon granella (Linnaeus, 1758)
Nemapogon gravosaellus Petersen, 1957
Nemapogon hungaricus Gozmany, 1960
Nemapogon inconditella (Lucas, 1956)
Nemapogon nigralbella (Zeller, 1839)
Nemapogon ruricolella (Stainton, 1849)
Nemapogon signatellus Petersen, 1957
Nemapogon variatella (Clemens, 1859)
Nemapogon wolffiella Karsholt & Nielsen, 1976
Nemaxera betulinella (Fabricius, 1787)
Neurothaumasia ankerella (Mann, 1867)
Niditinea fuscella (Linnaeus, 1758)
Niditinea striolella (Matsumura, 1931)
Reisserita relicinella (Herrich-Schäffer, 1853)
Tinea columbariella Wocke, 1877
Tinea dubiella Stainton, 1859
Tinea nonimella (Zagulajev, 1955)
Tinea pellionella Linnaeus, 1758
Tinea semifulvella Haworth, 1828
Tinea trinotella Thunberg, 1794
Tineola bisselliella (Hummel, 1823)
Triaxomera parasitella (Hübner, 1796)
Trichophaga bipartitella (Ragonot, 1892)
Trichophaga tapetzella (Linnaeus, 1758)

Tischeriidae
Coptotriche marginea (Haworth, 1828)

Tortricidae
Abrepagoge treitschkeana (Treitschke, 1835)
Acleris aspersana (Hübner, 1817)
Acleris bergmanniana (Linnaeus, 1758)
Acleris boscanoides Razowski, 1959
Acleris forsskaleana (Linnaeus, 1758)
Acleris holmiana (Linnaeus, 1758)
Acleris laterana (Fabricius, 1794)
Acleris literana (Linnaeus, 1758)
Acleris quercinana (Zeller, 1849)
Acleris rhombana (Denis & Schiffermüller, 1775)
Acleris schalleriana (Linnaeus, 1761)
Acleris variegana (Denis & Schiffermüller, 1775)
Adoxophyes orana (Fischer v. Röslerstamm, 1834)
Aethes bilbaensis (Rossler, 1877)
Aethes caucasica (Amsel, 1959)
Aethes cnicana (Westwood, 1854)
Aethes confinis Razowski, 1974
Aethes deutschiana (Zetterstedt, 1839)
Aethes eichleri Razowski, 1983
Aethes flagellana (Duponchel, 1836)
Aethes francillana (Fabricius, 1794)
Aethes hartmanniana (Clerck, 1759)
Aethes kasyi Razowski, 1962
Aethes margaritana (Haworth, 1811)
Aethes margaritifera Falkovitsh, 1963
Aethes mauritanica (Walsingham, 1898)
Aethes nefandana (Kennel, 1899)
Aethes rubigana (Treitschke, 1830)
Aethes smeathmanniana (Fabricius, 1781)
Aethes tesserana (Denis & Schiffermüller, 1775)
Aethes tornella (Walsingham, 1898)
Aethes triangulana (Treitschke, 1835)
Aethes williana (Brahm, 1791)
Agapeta hamana (Linnaeus, 1758)
Agapeta largana (Rebel, 1906)
Agapeta zoegana (Linnaeus, 1767)
Aleimma loeflingiana (Linnaeus, 1758)
Ancylis achatana (Denis & Schiffermüller, 1775)
Ancylis apicella (Denis & Schiffermüller, 1775)
Ancylis badiana (Denis & Schiffermüller, 1775)
Ancylis comptana (Frolich, 1828)
Ancylis geminana (Donovan, 1806)
Ancylis selenana (Guenee, 1845)
Ancylis unguicella (Linnaeus, 1758)
Aphelia viburniana (Denis & Schiffermüller, 1775)
Aphelia euxina (Djakonov, 1929)
Aphelia ferugana (Hübner, 1793)
Aphelia paleana (Hübner, 1793)
Apotomis capreana (Hübner, 1817)
Apotomis sauciana (Frolich, 1828)
Apotomis semifasciana (Haworth, 1811)
Archips crataegana (Hübner, 1799)
Archips oporana (Linnaeus, 1758)
Archips podana (Scopoli, 1763)
Archips rosana (Linnaeus, 1758)
Archips xylosteana (Linnaeus, 1758)
Argyroploce arbutella (Linnaeus, 1758)
Argyroploce noricana (Herrich-Schäffer, 1851)
Bactra furfurana (Haworth, 1811)
Bactra lancealana (Hübner, 1799)
Bactra robustana (Christoph, 1872)
Bactra venosana (Zeller, 1847)
Capricornia boisduvaliana (Duponchel, 1836)
Capua vulgana (Frolich, 1828)
Celypha aurofasciana (Haworth, 1811)
Celypha capreolana (Herrich-Schäffer, 1851)
Celypha cespitana (Hübner, 1817)
Celypha lacunana (Denis & Schiffermüller, 1775)
Celypha rivulana (Scopoli, 1763)
Celypha rosaceana Schlager, 1847
Celypha rufana (Scopoli, 1763)
Celypha rurestrana (Duponchel, 1843)
Celypha striana (Denis & Schiffermüller, 1775)
Choristoneura diversana (Hübner, 1817)
Choristoneura hebenstreitella (Muller, 1764)
Choristoneura murinana (Hübner, 1799)
Clepsis balcanica (Rebel, 1917)
Clepsis burgasiensis (Rebel, 1916)
Clepsis consimilana (Hübner, 1817)
Clepsis neglectana (Herrich-Schäffer, 1851)
Clepsis pallidana (Fabricius, 1776)
Clepsis rurinana (Linnaeus, 1758)
Clepsis senecionana (Hübner, 1819)
Clepsis spectrana (Treitschke, 1830)
Cnephasia asseclana (Denis & Schiffermüller, 1775)
Cnephasia communana (Herrich-Schäffer, 1851)
Cnephasia ecullyana Real, 1951
Cnephasia graecana Rebel, 1902
Cnephasia stephensiana (Doubleday, 1849)
Cnephasia abrasana (Duponchel, 1843)
Cnephasia incertana (Treitschke, 1835)
Cochylidia heydeniana (Herrich-Schäffer, 1851)
Cochylidia rupicola (Curtis, 1834)
Cochylidia subroseana (Haworth, 1811)
Cochylimorpha cultana (Lederer, 1855)
Cochylimorpha decolorella (Zeller, 1839)
Cochylimorpha meridiana (Staudinger, 1859)
Cochylimorpha straminea (Haworth, 1811)
Cochylimorpha woliniana (Schleich, 1868)
Cochylis defessana (Mann, 1861)
Cochylis epilinana Duponchel, 1842
Cochylis hybridella (Hübner, 1813)
Cochylis nana (Haworth, 1811)
Cochylis pallidana Zeller, 1847
Cochylis posterana Zeller, 1847
Cochylis roseana (Haworth, 1811)
Cochylis salebrana (Mann, 1862)
Crocidosema plebejana Zeller, 1847
Cryptocochylis conjunctana (Mann, 1864)
Cydia amplana (Hübner, 1800)
Cydia duplicana (Zetterstedt, 1839)
Cydia fagiglandana (Zeller, 1841)
Cydia illutana (Herrich-Schäffer, 1851)
Cydia inquinatana (Hübner, 1800)
Cydia microgrammana (Guenee, 1845)
Cydia pomonella (Linnaeus, 1758)
Cydia pyrivora (Danilevsky, 1947)
Cydia splendana (Hübner, 1799)
Cydia succedana (Denis & Schiffermüller, 1775)
Cymolomia hartigiana (Saxesen, 1840)
Diceratura ostrinana (Guenee, 1845)
Dichelia histrionana (Frolich, 1828)
Dichrorampha acuminatana (Lienig & Zeller, 1846)
Dichrorampha alpinana (Treitschke, 1830)
Dichrorampha incognitana (Kremky & Maslowski, 1933)
Dichrorampha incursana (Herrich-Schäffer, 1851)
Dichrorampha infuscata (Danilevsky, 1960)
Dichrorampha ligulana (Herrich-Schäffer, 1851)
Dichrorampha montanana (Duponchel, 1843)
Dichrorampha obscuratana (Wolff, 1955)
Dichrorampha plumbagana (Treitschke, 1830)
Dichrorampha plumbana (Scopoli, 1763)
Dichrorampha rilana Drenowski, 1909
Dichrorampha senectana Guenee, 1845
Eana incanana (Stephens, 1852)
Eana argentana (Clerck, 1759)
Eana canescana (Guenee, 1845)
Enarmonia formosana (Scopoli, 1763)
Endothenia ericetana (Humphreys & Westwood, 1845)
Endothenia gentianaeana (Hübner, 1799)
Endothenia nigricostana (Haworth, 1811)
Endothenia oblongana (Haworth, 1811)
Endothenia quadrimaculana (Haworth, 1811)
Endothenia ustulana (Haworth, 1811)
Epagoge grotiana (Fabricius, 1781)
Epiblema costipunctana (Haworth, 1811)
Epiblema foenella (Linnaeus, 1758)
Epiblema graphana (Treitschke, 1835)
Epiblema hepaticana (Treitschke, 1835)
Epiblema inulivora (Meyrick, 1932)
Epiblema junctana (Herrich-Schäffer, 1856)
Epiblema mendiculana (Treitschke, 1835)
Epiblema sarmatana (Christoph, 1872)
Epiblema scutulana (Denis & Schiffermüller, 1775)
Epiblema similana (Denis & Schiffermüller, 1775)
Epiblema sticticana (Fabricius, 1794)
Epiblema turbidana (Treitschke, 1835)
Epinotia abbreviana (Fabricius, 1794)
Epinotia bilunana (Haworth, 1811)
Epinotia cruciana (Linnaeus, 1761)
Epinotia fraternana (Haworth, 1811)
Epinotia nanana (Treitschke, 1835)
Epinotia nigristriana Budashkin & Zlatkov, 2011
Epinotia pygmaeana (Hübner, 1799)
Epinotia tedella (Clerck, 1759)
Eucosma albidulana (Herrich-Schäffer, 1851)
Eucosma aspidiscana (Hübner, 1817)
Eucosma caliacrana (Caradja, 1931)
Eucosma campoliliana (Denis & Schiffermüller, 1775)
Eucosma cana (Haworth, 1811)
Eucosma clarescens Kuznetsov, 1964
Eucosma conformana (Mann, 1872)
Eucosma conterminana (Guenee, 1845)
Eucosma cumulana (Guenee, 1845)
Eucosma metzneriana (Treitschke, 1830)
Eucosma obumbratana (Lienig & Zeller, 1846)
Eucosma pupillana (Clerck, 1759)
Eucosmomorpha albersana (Hübner, 1813)
Eudemis porphyrana (Hübner, 1799)
Eudemis profundana (Denis & Schiffermüller, 1775)
Eugnosta lathoniana (Hübner, 1800)
Eupoecilia ambiguella (Hübner, 1796)
Eupoecilia angustana (Hübner, 1799)
Falseuncaria ruficiliana (Haworth, 1811)
Fulvoclysia nerminae Kocak, 1982
Grapholita molesta (Busck, 1916)
Grapholita tenebrosana Duponchel, 1843
Grapholita coronillana Lienig & Zeller, 1846
Grapholita fissana (Frolich, 1828)
Grapholita lathyrana (Hübner, 1822)
Grapholita orobana Treitschke, 1830
Gypsonoma aceriana (Duponchel, 1843)
Gypsonoma dealbana (Frolich, 1828)
Gypsonoma minutana (Hübner, 1799)
Hedya nubiferana (Haworth, 1811)
Hedya ochroleucana (Frolich, 1828)
Hedya pruniana (Hübner, 1799)
Hedya salicella (Linnaeus, 1758)
Hysterophora maculosana (Haworth, 1811)
Isotrias hybridana (Hübner, 1817)
Lathronympha strigana (Fabricius, 1775)
Lobesia artemisiana (Zeller, 1847)
Lobesia bicinctana (Duponchel, 1844)
Lobesia botrana (Denis & Schiffermüller, 1775)
Lobesia indusiana (Zeller, 1847)
Lobesia reliquana (Hübner, 1825)
Lozotaenia forsterana (Fabricius, 1781)
Metendothenia atropunctana (Zetterstedt, 1839)
Neosphaleroptera nubilana (Hübner, 1799)
Notocelia roborana (Denis & Schiffermüller, 1775)
Notocelia trimaculana (Haworth, 1811)
Olethreutes arcuella (Clerck, 1759)
Orthotaenia undulana (Denis & Schiffermüller, 1775)
Pammene amygdalana (Duponchel, 1842)
Pammene christophana (Moschler, 1862)
Pammene fasciana (Linnaeus, 1761)
Pammene mariana (Zerny, 1920)
Pammene oxycedrana (Milliere, 1876)
Pammene regiana (Zeller, 1849)
Pandemis cerasana (Hübner, 1786)
Pandemis chondrillana (Herrich-Schäffer, 1860)
Pandemis cinnamomeana (Treitschke, 1830)
Pandemis corylana (Fabricius, 1794)
Pandemis dumetana (Treitschke, 1835)
Pandemis heparana (Denis & Schiffermüller, 1775)
Paramesia gnomana (Clerck, 1759)
Pelochrista agrestana (Treitschke, 1830)
Pelochrista caecimaculana (Hübner, 1799)
Pelochrista decolorana (Freyer, 1842)
Pelochrista fusculana (Zeller, 1847)
Pelochrista infidana (Hübner, 1824)
Pelochrista mancipiana (Mann, 1855)
Pelochrista medullana (Staudinger, 1879)
Pelochrista modicana (Zeller, 1847)
Pelochrista mollitana (Zeller, 1847)
Periclepsis cinctana (Denis & Schiffermüller, 1775)
Phalonidia affinitana (Douglas, 1846)
Phalonidia contractana (Zeller, 1847)
Phalonidia gilvicomana (Zeller, 1847)
Phalonidia manniana (Fischer v. Röslerstamm, 1839)
Phaneta pauperana (Duponchel, 1843)
Phiaris stibiana (Guenee, 1845)
Philedone gerningana (Denis & Schiffermüller, 1775)
Philedonides lunana (Thunberg, 1784)
Phtheochroa drenowskyi (Rebel, 1916)
Phtheochroa inopiana (Haworth, 1811)
Phtheochroa procerana (Lederer, 1853)
Pristerognatha penthinana (Guenee, 1845)
Propiromorpha rhodophana (Herrich-Schäffer, 1851)
Pseudargyrotoza conwagana (Fabricius, 1775)
Pseudeulia asinana (Hübner, 1799)
Pseudococcyx posticana (Zetterstedt, 1839)
Pseudococcyx tessulatana (Staudinger, 1871)
Pseudosciaphila branderiana (Linnaeus, 1758)
Ptycholoma lecheana (Linnaeus, 1758)
Ptycholomoides aeriferana (Herrich-Schäffer, 1851)
Rhyacionia buoliana (Denis & Schiffermüller, 1775)
Rhyacionia hafneri (Rebel, 1937)
Rhyacionia pinivorana (Lienig & Zeller, 1846)
Sparganothis pilleriana (Denis & Schiffermüller, 1775)
Spilonota ocellana (Denis & Schiffermüller, 1775)
Syndemis musculana (Hübner, 1799)
Thiodia citrana (Hübner, 1799)
Thiodia lerneana (Treitschke, 1835)
Thiodia major (Rebel, 1903)
Thiodia trochilana (Frolich, 1828)
Tortrix viridana Linnaeus, 1758
Tosirips magyarus Razowski, 1987
Zeiraphera isertana (Fabricius, 1794)
Zeiraphera rufimitrana (Herrich-Schäffer, 1851)

Yponomeutidae
Cedestis gysseleniella Zeller, 1839
Kessleria alpicella (Stainton, 1851)
Ocnerostoma piniariella Zeller, 1847
Paraswammerdamia albicapitella (Scharfenberg, 1805)
Paraswammerdamia nebulella (Goeze, 1783)
Pseudoswammerdamia combinella (Hübner, 1786)
Scythropia crataegella (Linnaeus, 1767)
Swammerdamia caesiella (Hübner, 1796)
Swammerdamia compunctella Herrich-Schäffer, 1855
Swammerdamia pyrella (Villers, 1789)
Yponomeuta cagnagella (Hübner, 1813)
Yponomeuta evonymella (Linnaeus, 1758)
Yponomeuta irrorella (Hübner, 1796)
Yponomeuta malinellus Zeller, 1838
Yponomeuta padella (Linnaeus, 1758)
Yponomeuta plumbella (Denis & Schiffermüller, 1775)
Yponomeuta rorrella (Hübner, 1796)
Yponomeuta sedella Treitschke, 1832

Ypsolophidae
Ypsolopha alpella (Denis & Schiffermüller, 1775)
Ypsolopha asperella (Linnaeus, 1761)
Ypsolopha chazariella (Mann, 1866)
Ypsolopha falcella (Denis & Schiffermüller, 1775)
Ypsolopha horridella (Treitschke, 1835)
Ypsolopha lucella (Fabricius, 1775)
Ypsolopha nemorella (Linnaeus, 1758)
Ypsolopha parenthesella (Linnaeus, 1761)
Ypsolopha persicella (Fabricius, 1787)
Ypsolopha scabrella (Linnaeus, 1761)
Ypsolopha sculpturella (Herrich-Schäffer, 1854)
Ypsolopha sequella (Clerck, 1759)
Ypsolopha sylvella (Linnaeus, 1767)
Ypsolopha ustella (Clerck, 1759)
Ypsolopha vittella (Linnaeus, 1758)

Zygaenidae
Adscita albanica (Naufock, 1926)
Adscita geryon (Hübner, 1813)
Adscita obscura (Zeller, 1847)
Adscita statices (Linnaeus, 1758)
Adscita mannii (Lederer, 1853)
Jordanita chloros (Hübner, 1813)
Jordanita globulariae (Hübner, 1793)
Jordanita graeca (Jordan, 1907)
Jordanita subsolana (Staudinger, 1862)
Jordanita budensis (Ad. & Au. Speyer, 1858)
Jordanita notata (Zeller, 1847)
Rhagades pruni (Denis & Schiffermüller, 1775)
Theresimima ampellophaga (Bayle-Barelle, 1808)
Zygaena carniolica (Scopoli, 1763)
Zygaena sedi Fabricius, 1787
Zygaena brizae (Esper, 1800)
Zygaena laeta (Hübner, 1790)
Zygaena minos (Denis & Schiffermüller, 1775)
Zygaena punctum Ochsenheimer, 1808
Zygaena purpuralis (Brunnich, 1763)
Zygaena angelicae Ochsenheimer, 1808
Zygaena ephialtes (Linnaeus, 1767)
Zygaena filipendulae (Linnaeus, 1758)
Zygaena lonicerae (Scheven, 1777)
Zygaena loti (Denis & Schiffermüller, 1775)
Zygaena nevadensis Rambur, 1858
Zygaena osterodensis Reiss, 1921
Zygaena viciae (Denis & Schiffermüller, 1775)

External links
Fauna Europaea

Bulgaria, lepid
Lepidoptera
 Bulgaria
Bulgaria
Bulgaria
Fauna of Bulgaria